= Moskovskiye Vorota (Saint Petersburg Metro) =

Saint Petersburg Metro Station

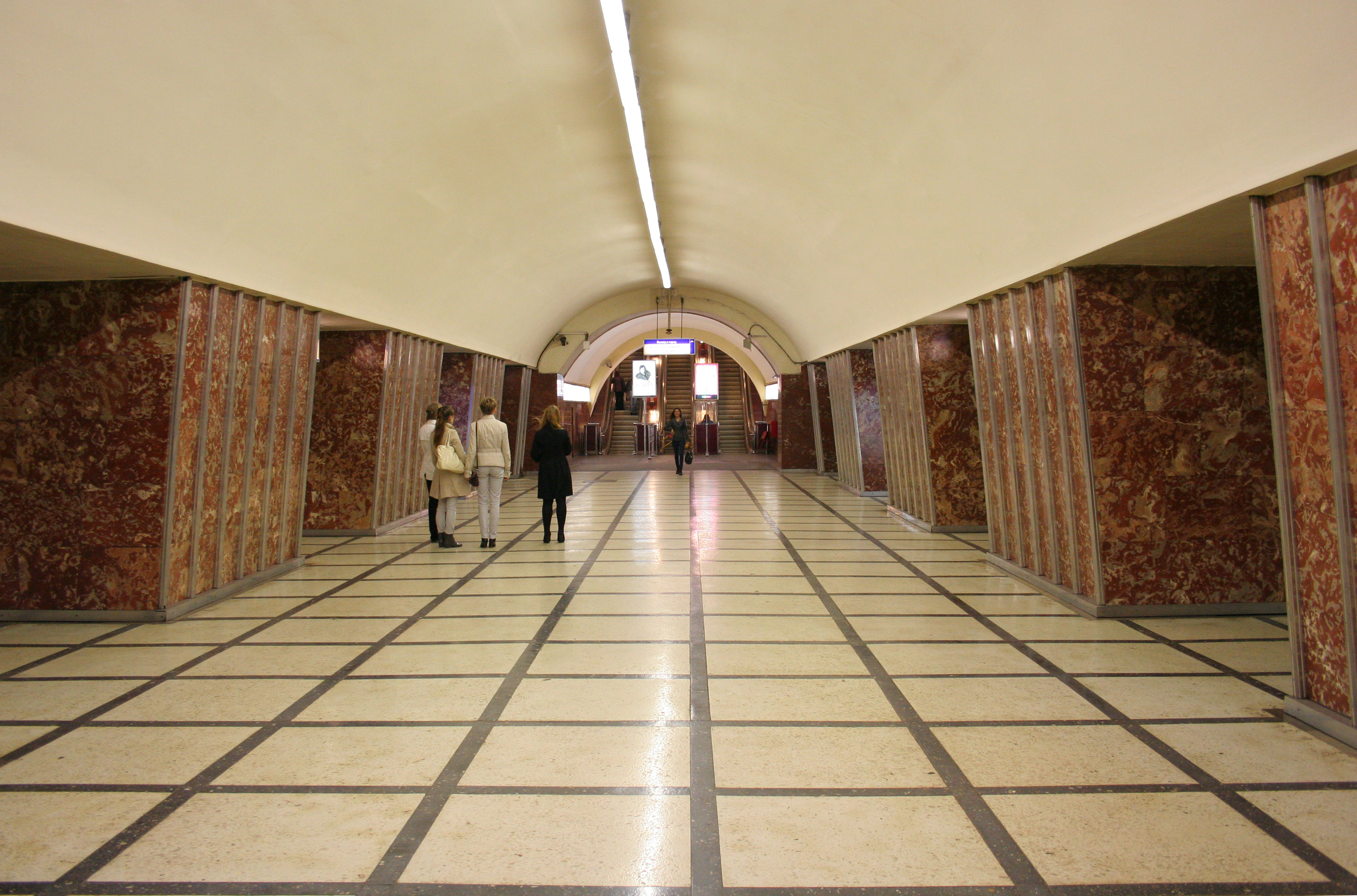
- Station Hall

General information
- Location: Moskovsky District; Saint Petersburg; Russia
- Coordinates: 59°53′30.51″N 30°19′4.37″E
- System: Saint Petersburg Metro station
- Owner: Saint Petersburg Metro
- Line: Moskovsko–Petrogradskaya Line
- Platforms: 1 (Island platform)
- Tracks: 2

Construction
- Structure type: Underground

History
- Opened: 1961-04-29
- Electrified: Third rail

Services
Preceding station	Saint Petersburg Metro	Following station
Frunzenskaya towards Parnas	Line 2	Elektrosila towards Kupchino
Route map
Location

Moskovskiye Vorota (Russian: Москóвские ворóта, Moscow Gate) is a station of the Saint Petersburg Metro. The station was opened on April 29, 1961.

== Significant cultural objects ==
Moscow Triumphal Gate is located near the station.

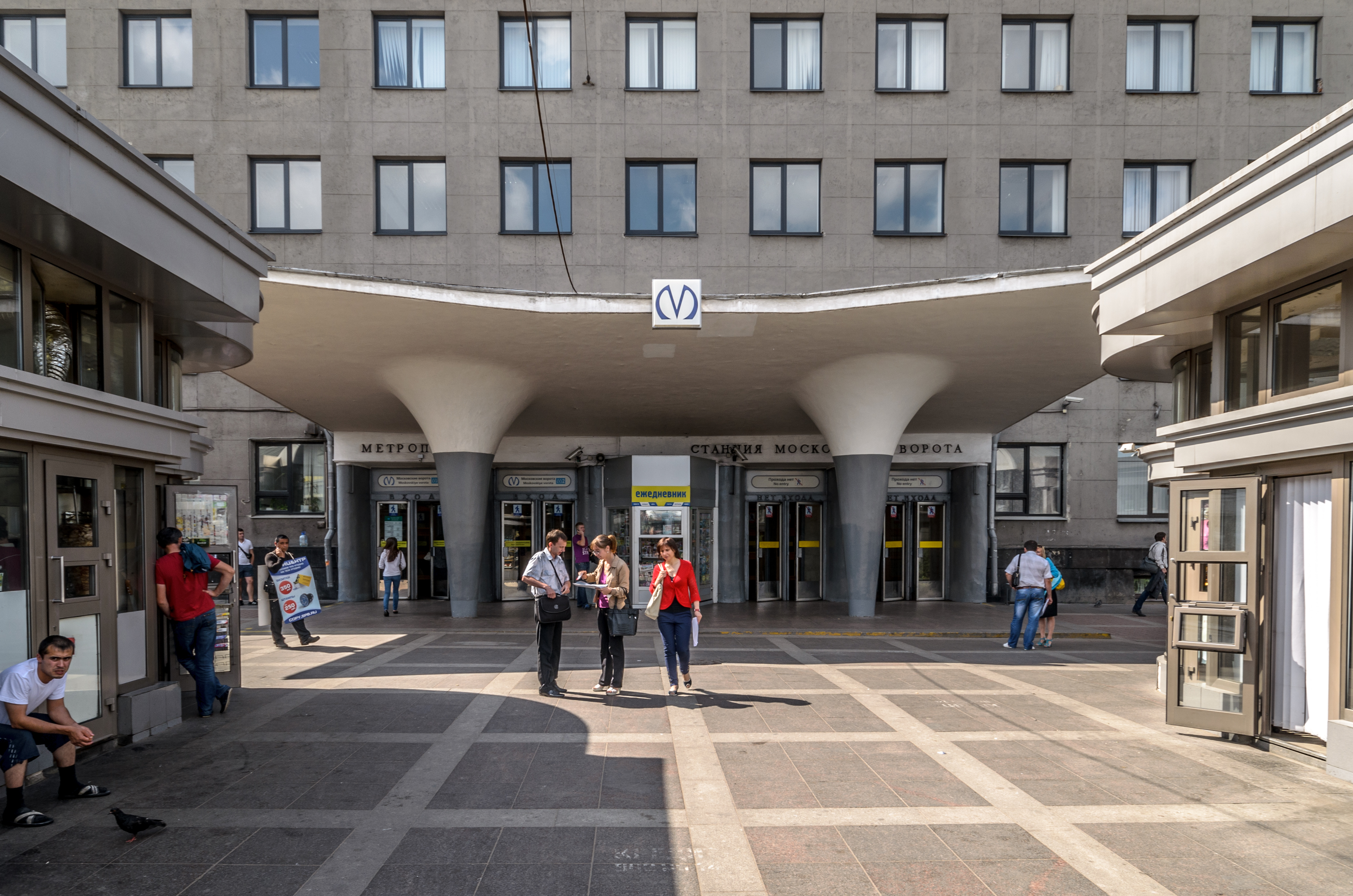
Entry in metro station
