= Frunzenskaya (Saint Petersburg Metro) =

Saint Petersburg Metro Station

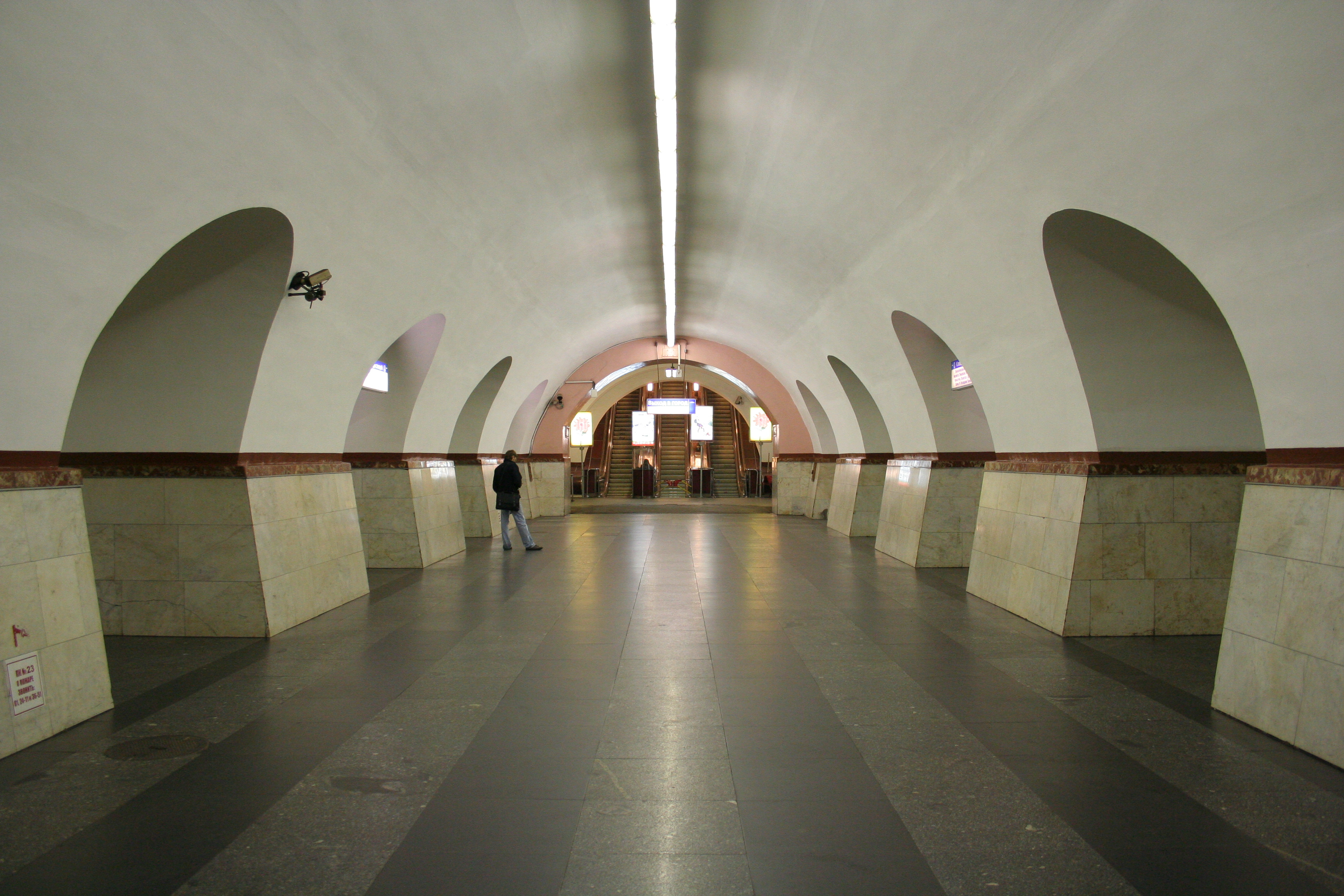
- Station Hall

General information
- Location: Admiralteysky District; Saint Petersburg; Russia
- Coordinates: 59°54′22.61″N 30°19′2.82″E
- System: Saint Petersburg Metro station
- Owner: Saint Petersburg Metro
- Line: Moskovsko–Petrogradskaya Line
- Platforms: 1 (Island platform)
- Tracks: 2

Construction
- Structure type: Underground

History
- Opened: 29 April 1961
- Electrified: Third rail

Services
Preceding station	Saint Petersburg Metro	Following station
Tekhnologichesky Institut towards Parnas	Line 2	Moskovskiye Vorota towards Kupchino
Route map
Location

Frunzenskaya (Russian: Фру́нзенская) is a station of the Saint Petersburg Metro. The station opened on 29 April 1961.
