= Gorkovskaya (Saint Petersburg Metro) =

Saint Petersburg Metro Station

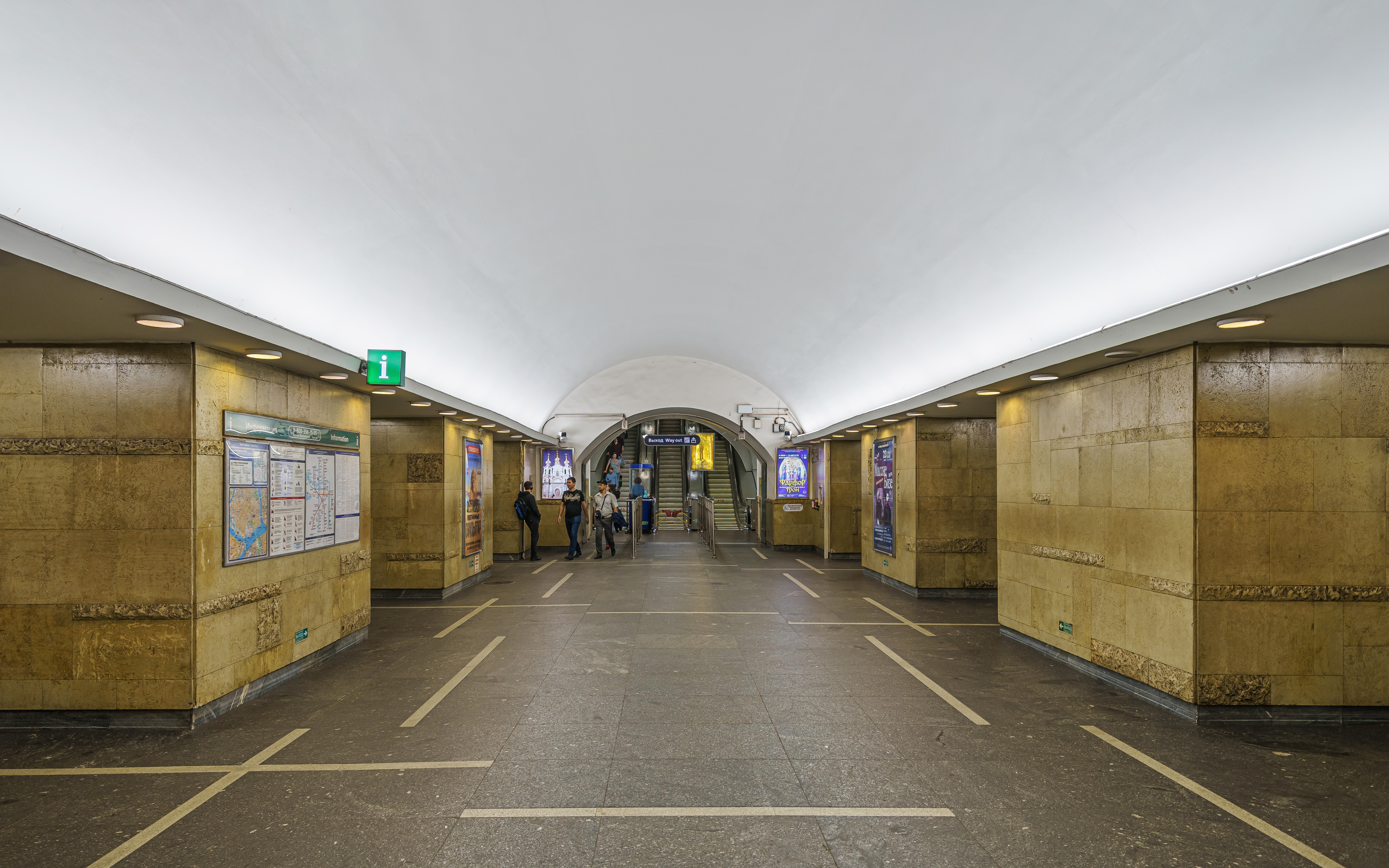
- Station Hall

General information
- Location: Petrogradsky District; Saint Petersburg; Russia
- Coordinates: 59°57′22″N 30°19′08″E
- System: Saint Petersburg Metro station
- Owner: Saint Petersburg Metro
- Line: Moskovsko–Petrogradskaya Line
- Platforms: 1 (Island platform)
- Tracks: 2

Construction
- Structure type: Underground

History
- Opened: July 1, 1963
- Rebuilt: 2009
- Electrified: Third rail

Services
Preceding station	Saint Petersburg Metro	Following station
Petrogradskaya towards Parnas	Line 2	Nevsky Prospekt towards Kupchino
Route map
Location

Gorkovskaya (Russian: Го́рьковская) is a station on the Moskovsko-Petrogradskaya Line of the Saint Petersburg Metro. It was designed by A.S. Getskin, V.P. Shuvalova, S.L.Mihaylov, H.I. Bashnin, S.I. Evdokimov, A.P. Izoitko and E.I. Travnikov. It opened on July 1, 1963. The station's name was derived from Maxim Gorky Avenue (later renamed Kronverskiy Avenue). The station was designed as a tribute to the writer.

The ground-level vestibule is located at the intersection between Kamennoostrovsky and Kronverksky Prospects. The vestibule is designed to withstand a direct impact during carpet bombing.

The station closed in October 2008 for a 14-month reconstruction and reopened in December 2009 as initially planned.

== Gallery ==
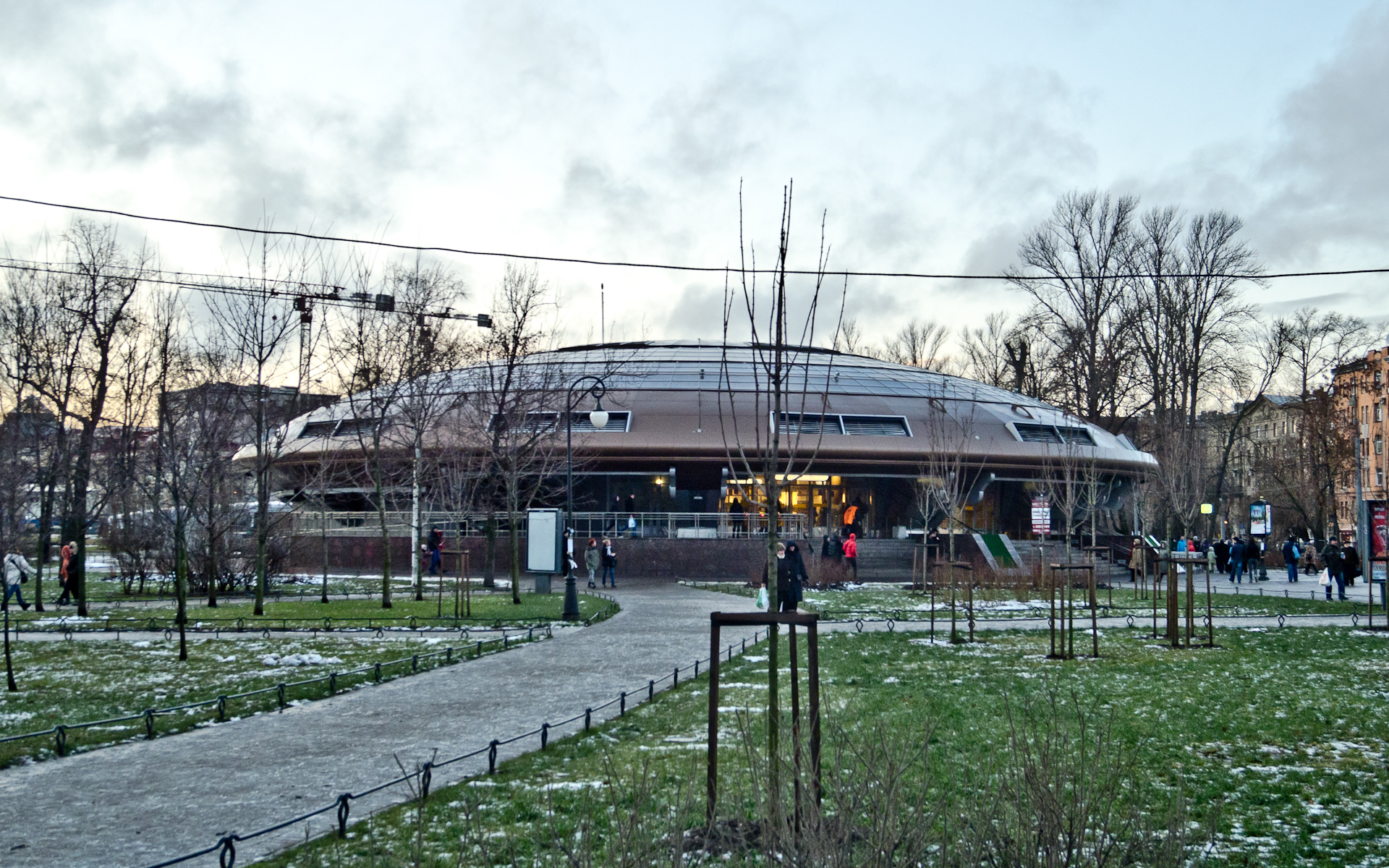
Entrance to the station

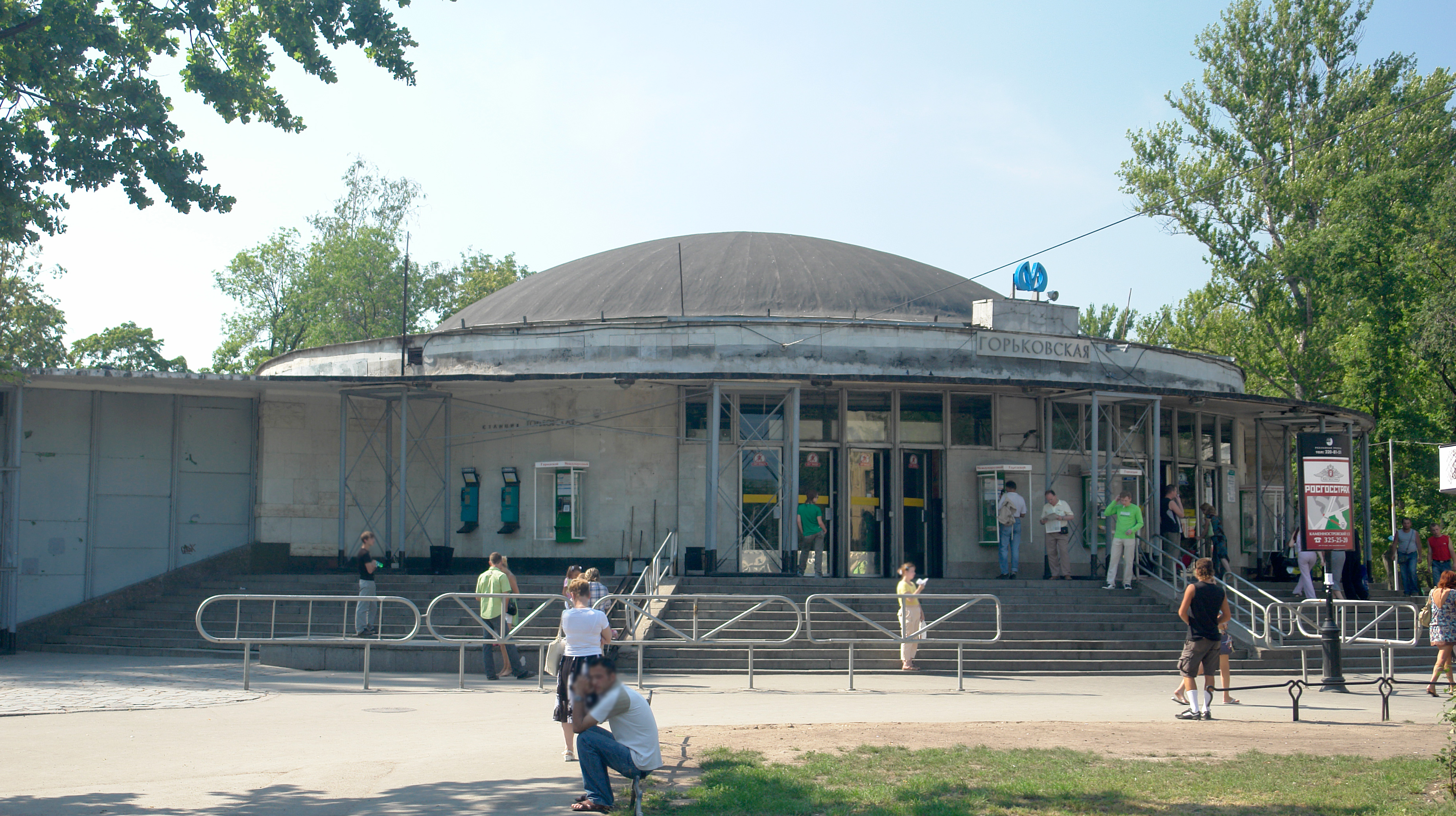
Original station entrance in 2007

== Notable landmarks ==
The station is located in proximity to Peter and Paul Fortress, as well as the Saint Petersburg Mosque and Leningrad Zoo.
