= Elektrosila (Saint Petersburg Metro) =

Saint Petersburg Metro Station

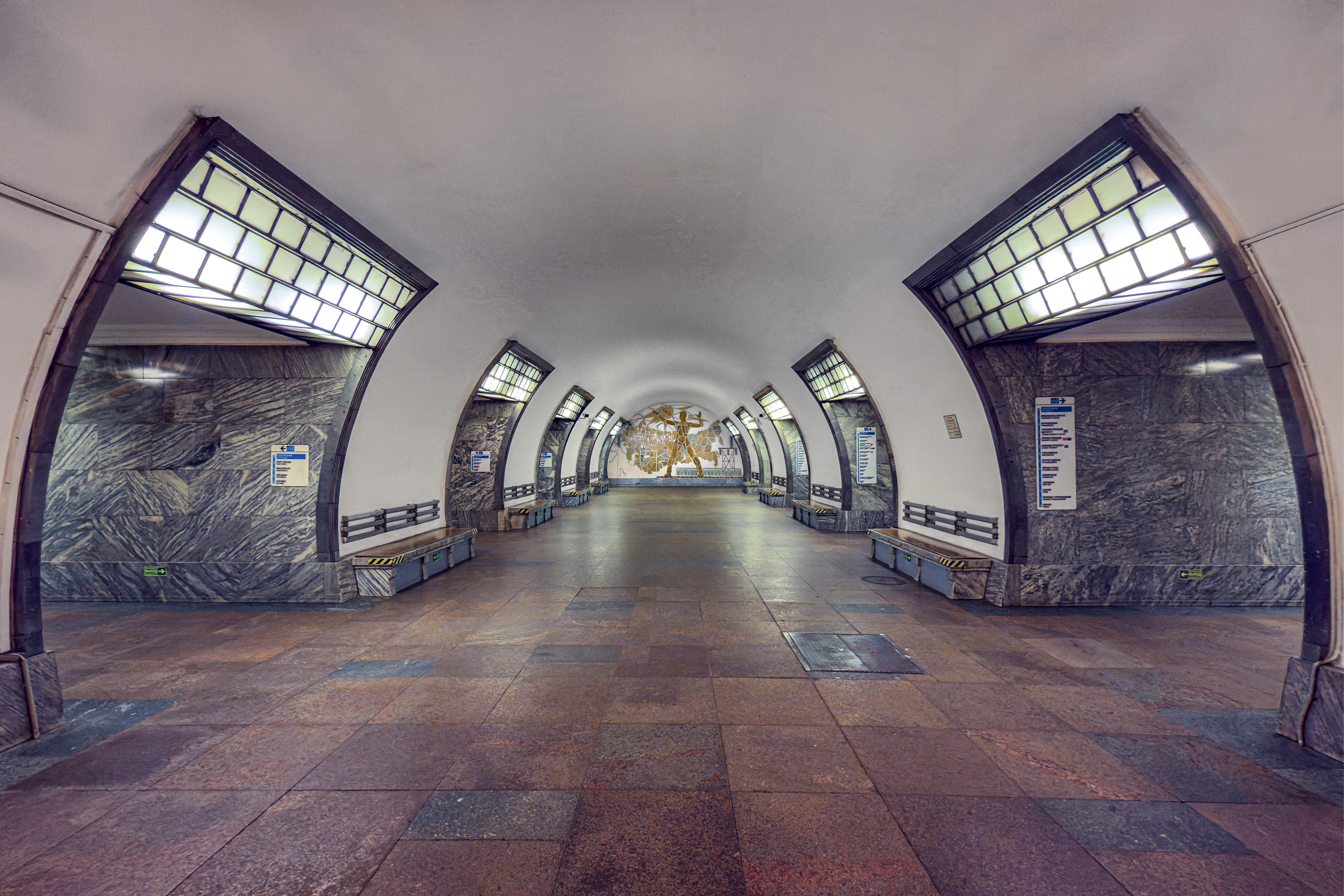
- Station Hall

General information
- Location: Moskovsky District; Saint Petersburg; Russia
- Coordinates: 59°52′45.13″N 30°19′7.12″E
- System: Saint Petersburg Metro station
- Owner: Saint Petersburg Metro
- Line: Moskovsko–Petrogradskaya Line
- Platforms: 1 (Island platform)
- Tracks: 2

Construction
- Structure type: Underground

History
- Opened: 1961-04-29
- Electrified: Third rail

Services
Preceding station	Saint Petersburg Metro	Following station
Moskovskiye Vorota towards Parnas	Line 2	Park Pobedy towards Kupchino
Route map
Location

Elektrosila (Russian: Электроси́ла) is a station of the Saint Petersburg Metro. Opened on 29 April 1961.
