= Pionerskaya (Saint Petersburg Metro) =

Saint Petersburg Metro Station

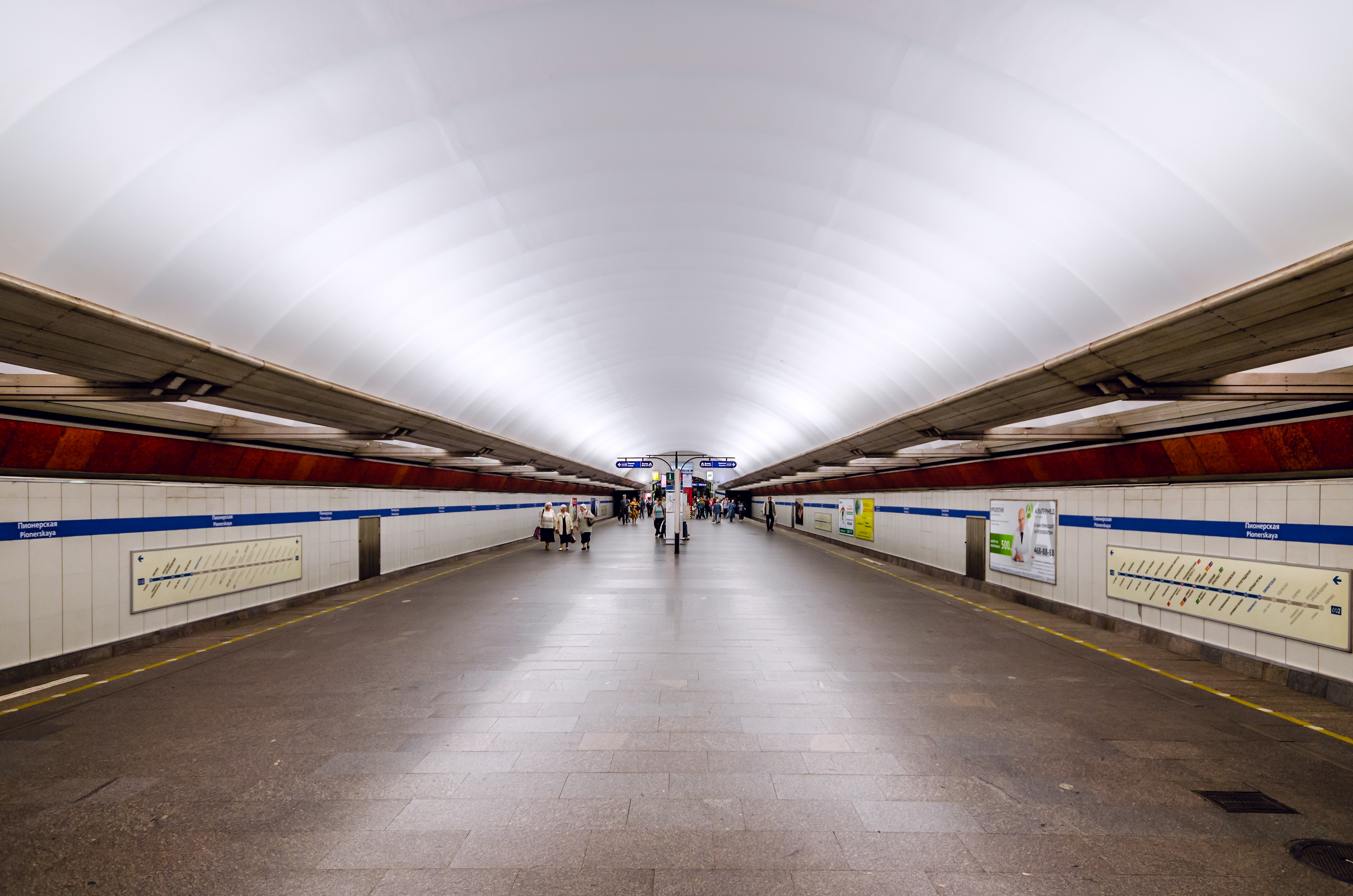
- Station Hall

General information
- Location: Primorsky District; Saint Petersburg; Russia
- Coordinates: 60°0′8.94″N 30°17′48.51″E
- System: Saint Petersburg Metro station
- Owner: Saint Petersburg Metro
- Line: Moskovsko–Petrogradskaya Line
- Platforms: 1 (Island platform)
- Tracks: 2

Construction
- Structure type: Underground

Other information
- Station code: 15

History
- Opened: 1982-11-04
- Electrified: Third rail

Services
Preceding station	Saint Petersburg Metro	Following station
Udelnaya towards Parnas	Line 2	Chyornaya Rechka towards Kupchino
Route map
Location

Pionerskaya (Russian: Пионе́рская) is a station of the Saint Petersburg Metro opened on 4 November 1982.
