= Udelnaya (Saint Petersburg Metro) =

Saint Petersburg Metro Station

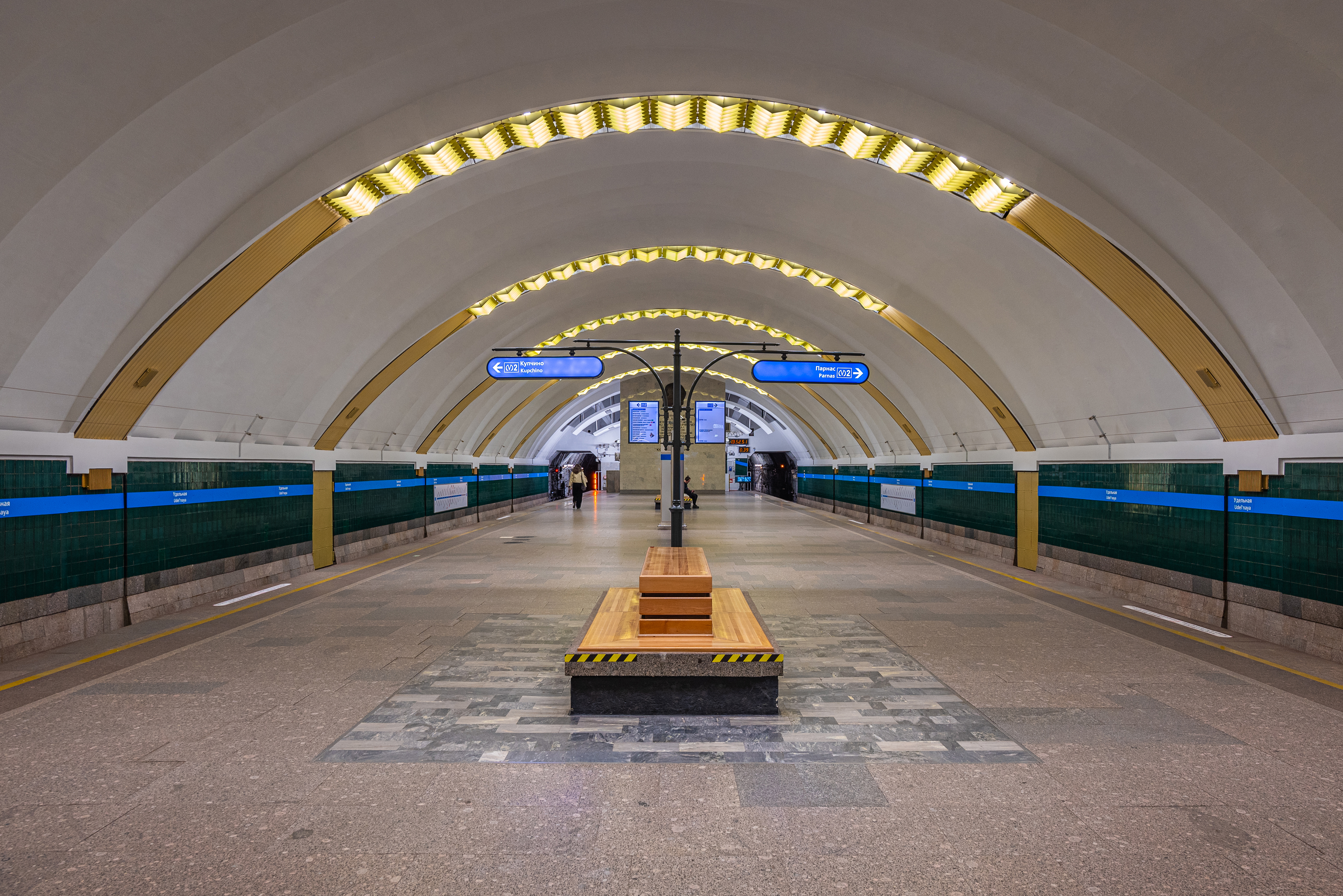
- Station Hall

General information
- Location: Vyborgsky District; Saint Petersburg; Russia
- Coordinates: 60°0′59.98″N 30°18′56.33″E
- System: Saint Petersburg Metro station
- Owner: Saint Petersburg Metro
- Line: Moskovsko–Petrogradskaya Line
- Platforms: 1 (Island platform)
- Tracks: 2

Construction
- Structure type: Underground
- Depth: 64 metres (210 ft)

Other information
- Station code: 14

History
- Opened: 1982-11-04
- Electrified: Third rail

Services
Preceding station	Saint Petersburg Metro	Following station
Ozerki towards Parnas	Line 2	Pionerskaya towards Kupchino
Route map
Location

Udelnaya (Russian: Уде́льная) is a station on Line 2 of the Saint Petersburg Metro. It opened on 4 November 1982.

== Architecture ==
At the end of the platform, there is a memorial plaque dedicated to when Vladimir Lenin escaped to Finland from Udelnaya railway station.
