= Zvyozdnaya =

Saint Petersburg Metro Station

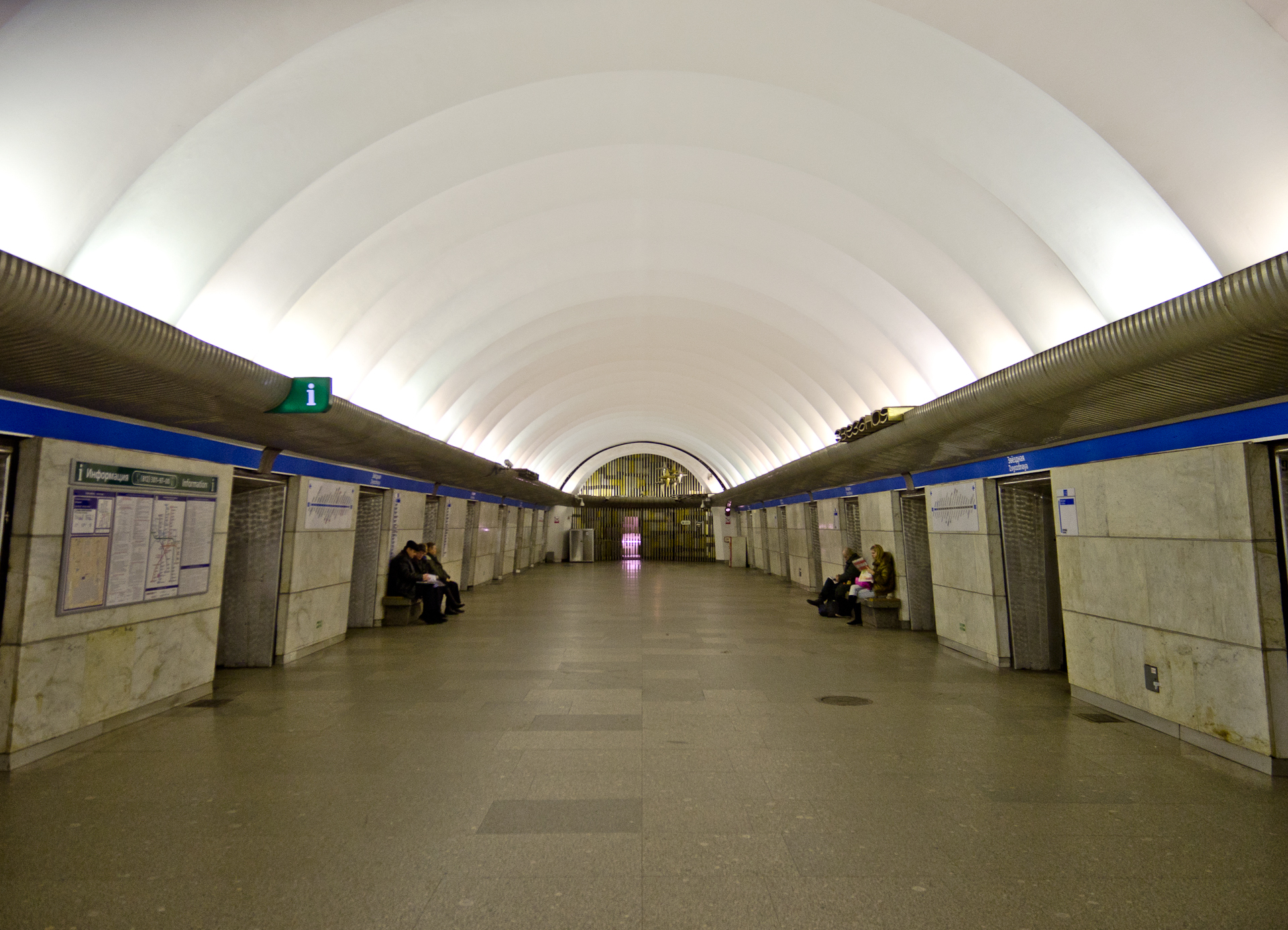
- Station Hall

General information
- Location: Moskovsky District; Saint Petersburg; Russia
- Coordinates: 59°49′59.64″N 30°20′58.17″E
- System: Saint Petersburg Metro station
- Owner: Saint Petersburg Metro
- Line: Moskovsko–Petrogradskaya Line
- Platforms: 1 (Island platform)
- Tracks: 2

Construction
- Structure type: Underground

History
- Opened: 1972-12-25
- Electrified: Third rail

Services
Preceding station	Saint Petersburg Metro	Following station
Moskovskaya towards Parnas	Line 2	Kupchino Terminus
Route map
Location

Zvyozdnaya (Russian: Звёздная, "starry") is a station on the Moskovsko-Petrogradskaya Line of the Saint Petersburg Metro. It was opened on December 25, 1972. It was designed by K.N. Afonskya, A.C. Getskin and V.P. Shuvalova. In the original blueprints, the station was called "Imeni Lensoveta" (Soviet of Leningrad Honorary station).

== Location ==
The station is adjacent to Krylov State Research Center.

== Transit connections ==
- Tramway - Route 29
- Municipal Bus - Routes 34, 50, 59, 64, 64А, 116, 179, 192, 128
- Marshrutka - К-86, К-138, К-116, К-151, К-201, К-293, К-292, К-293а, К-296, К-296а, К-350, К-363, К-479, К-610, К-610а
