= Moskovskaya (Saint Petersburg Metro) =

Saint Petersburg Metro Station

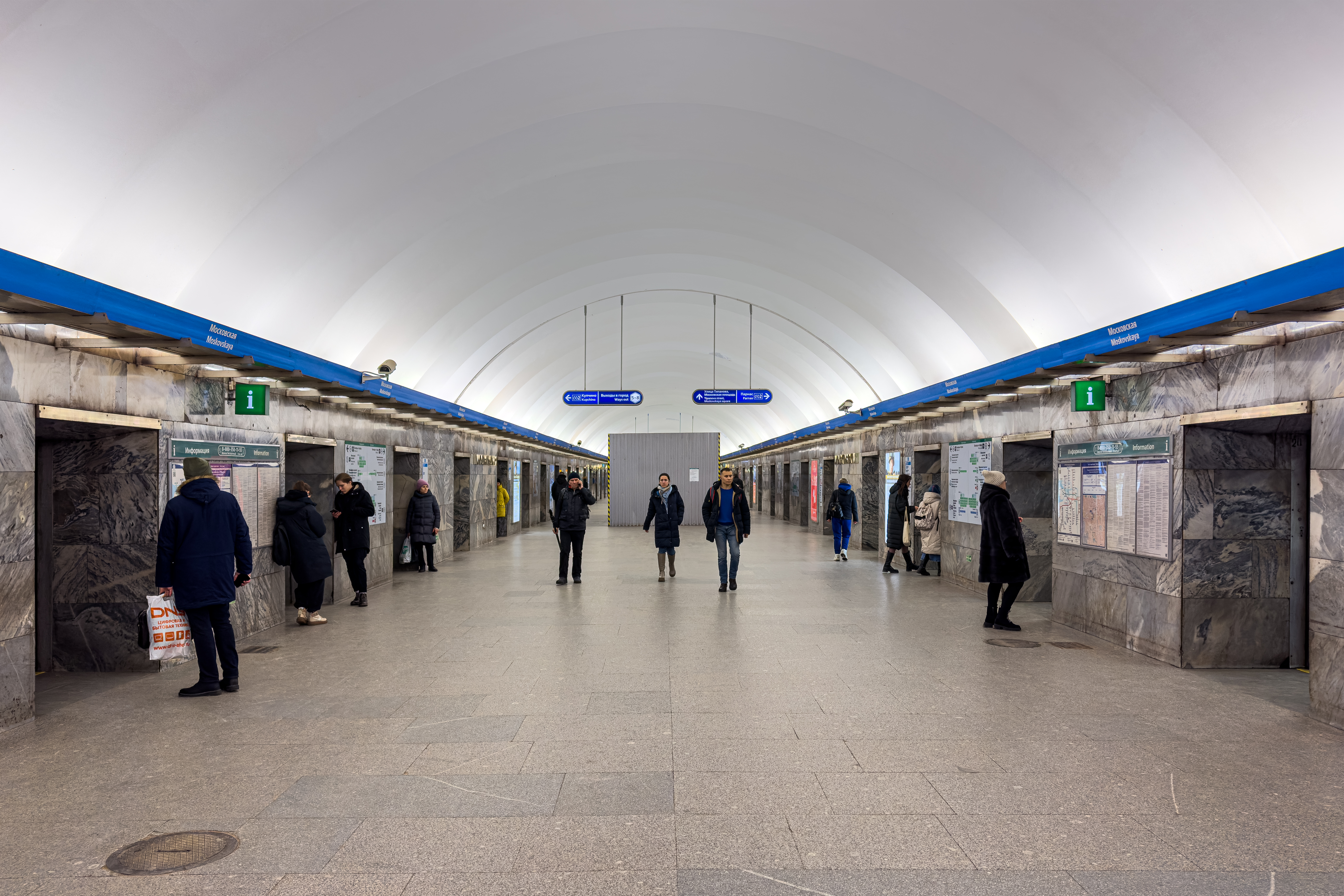
- Station Hall

General information
- Location: Moskovsky District; Saint Petersburg; Russia
- Coordinates: 59°51′7.89″N 30°19′19.94″E
- System: Saint Petersburg Metro station
- Operator: Saint Petersburg Metro
- Line: Moskovsko–Petrogradskaya Line
- Platforms: 1 (Island platform)
- Tracks: 2
- Connections: Bus terminal

Construction
- Structure type: Underground

History
- Opened: 1969-12-25
- Electrified: Third rail

Services
Preceding station	Saint Petersburg Metro	Following station
Park Pobedy towards Parnas	Line 2	Zvyozdnaya towards Kupchino
Location

Moskovskaya (Russian: Моско́вская) is a station on the Moskovsko–Petrogradskaya Line of the Saint Petersburg Metro. Although it was opened on December 25, 1969, it is equipped with the so-called platform screen doors. Moskovskaya metro-station is one of the first stations in the world with such a system of doors.

From Moskovskaya metro-station there is a direct connection to the Terminal One of Pulkovo Airport by shuttles buses No.39, 39E and K39.
