= Tekhnologichesky Institut (Saint Petersburg Metro) =

Saint Petersburg Metro Station

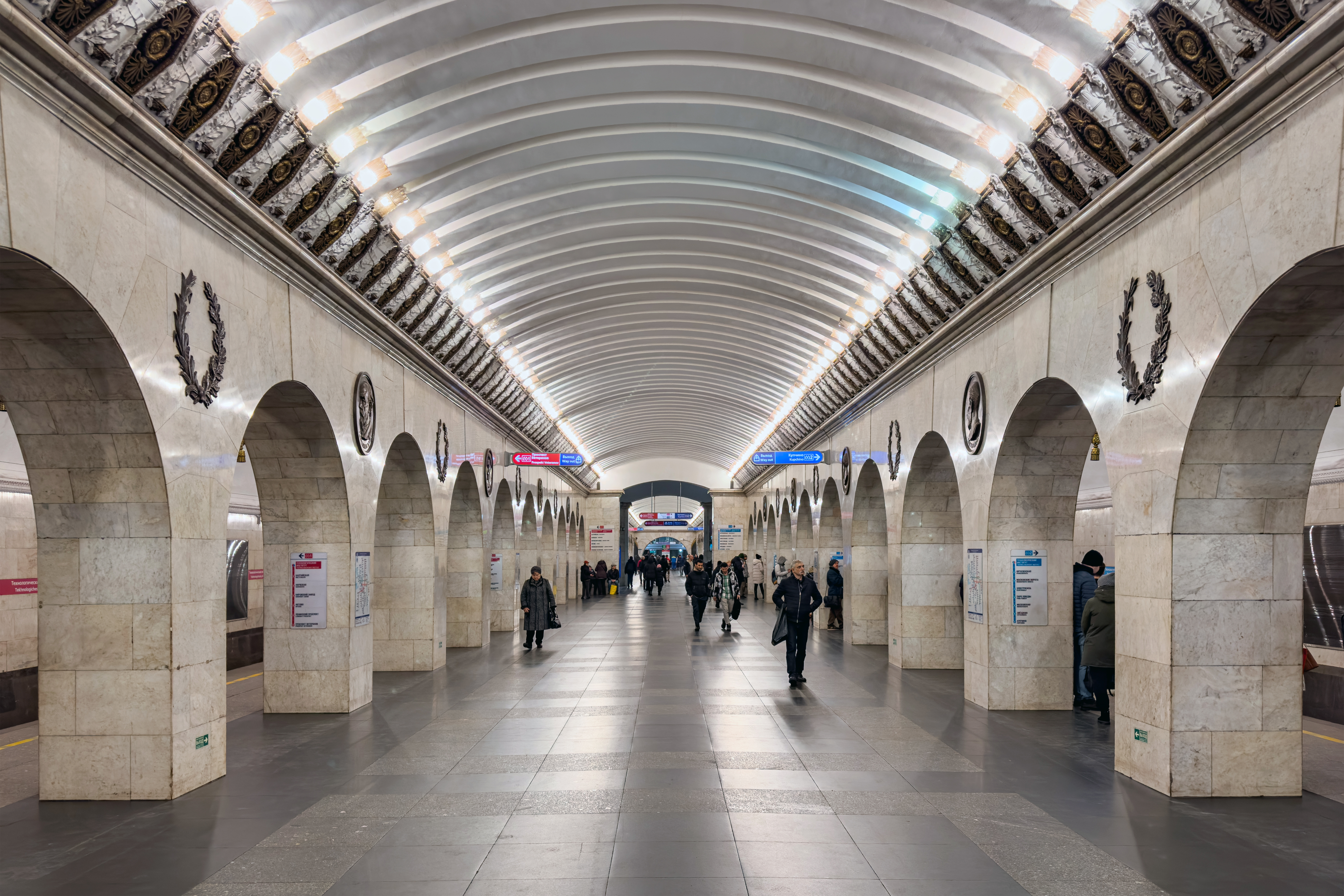
- Southern hall of the station

General information
- Location: Admiralteysky District; Saint Petersburg; Russia
- Coordinates: 59°54′59″N 30°19′07″E
- System: Saint Petersburg Metro station
- Owner: Saint Petersburg Metro
- Lines: Kirovsko–Vyborgskaya Line; Moskovsko–Petrogradskaya Line
- Platforms: 1 (Island platform)
- Tracks: 2

Construction
- Structure type: Underground
- Depth: 60 metres (200 ft)

History
- Opened: November 15, 1955
- Electrified: Third rail

Services
Preceding station	Saint Petersburg Metro	Following station
Pushkinskaya towards Devyatkino	Line 1	Baltiyskaya towards Prospekt Veteranov
Sennaya Ploshchad towards Parnas	Line 2	Frunzenskaya towards Kupchino
Route map
Kirovsko-Vyborgskaya
Moskovsko-Petrogradskaya
Location

Tekhnologichesky Institut (Russian: Технологи́ческий институ́т, IPA: [tʲɪxnəlɐˈɡʲitɕɪskʲɪj ɪnstʲɪˈtut]) (English: Technology Institute) is a cross-platform interchange station of the Saint Petersburg Metro. The station consists of two halls, both serving the Kirovsko-Vyborgskaya Line and Moskovsko-Petrogradskaya Line trains. The first hall serves the southbound trains, while the second hall serves the northbound ones.

== History ==
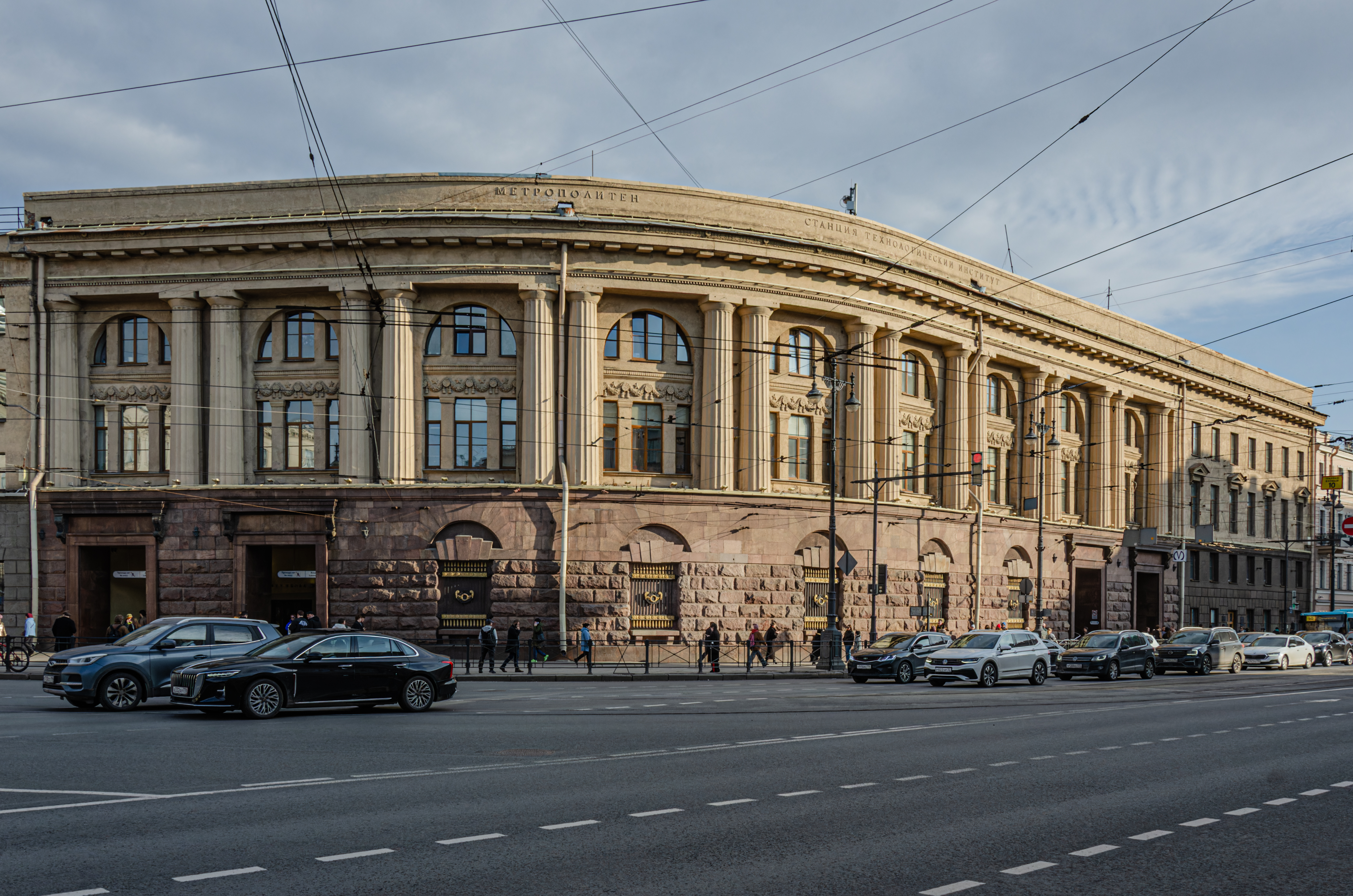
Entrance hall

The first hall was opened on November 15, 1955, as part of the first metro line between Avtovo and Ploshchad Vosstaniya. The name comes from the fact that the surface vestibule is located immediately next to Saint Petersburg State Institute of Technology. The architects were A. M. Sokolov and A. K. Andreyev (surface vestibule and underground hall). The basic theme of the station is the achievements of Russian and Soviet science. The basic material for decorating the underground hall is Ural marble. On the columns are 24 bas reliefs with portraits of well-known Soviet scientists. On the platform walls are placed decorative grilles.

This deep column station existed for several years as an ordinary station of the Kirovsko-Vyborgskaya Line, with trains traveling in both directions. But on April 29, 1961, the second hall was opened, as a part of the second line of the Saint Petersburg Metro. This became the first cross-platform facility in the USSR, coming into full operation on November 1, 1963.

The second hall, in contrast to the first, was built in the functional style, called for by Nikita Khrushchev's program of total economy. The architects A. I. Pribulskiy, A. Ya. Macheret, and V. V. Gankevich designed an almost white wall with decorative texts on the marble columns, chronicling the accomplishments of Soviet science and technology, which were continually added to over time.

Initially, the second hall had no exit to the surface and was connected to the first by a central passage, during the construction of which the bas reliefs of Friedrich Engels and Joseph Stalin were removed. Only in 1980 did the architects A. S. Getskin, A. V. Kvyatovsky, and I. E. Sergeyev build a second inclined passage and join the vestibule of the first hall with the second.

Exits from both halls are located at the northern end, with three escalators each.

On April 3, 2017, a suicide bomber exploded on a train in Moskovsko-Petrogradskaya line between Sennaya Ploshchad and Tekhnologichesky Institut stations, killing at least 14 people and injuring dozens.
