= Chyornaya Rechka (Saint Petersburg Metro) =

Saint Petersburg Metro Station

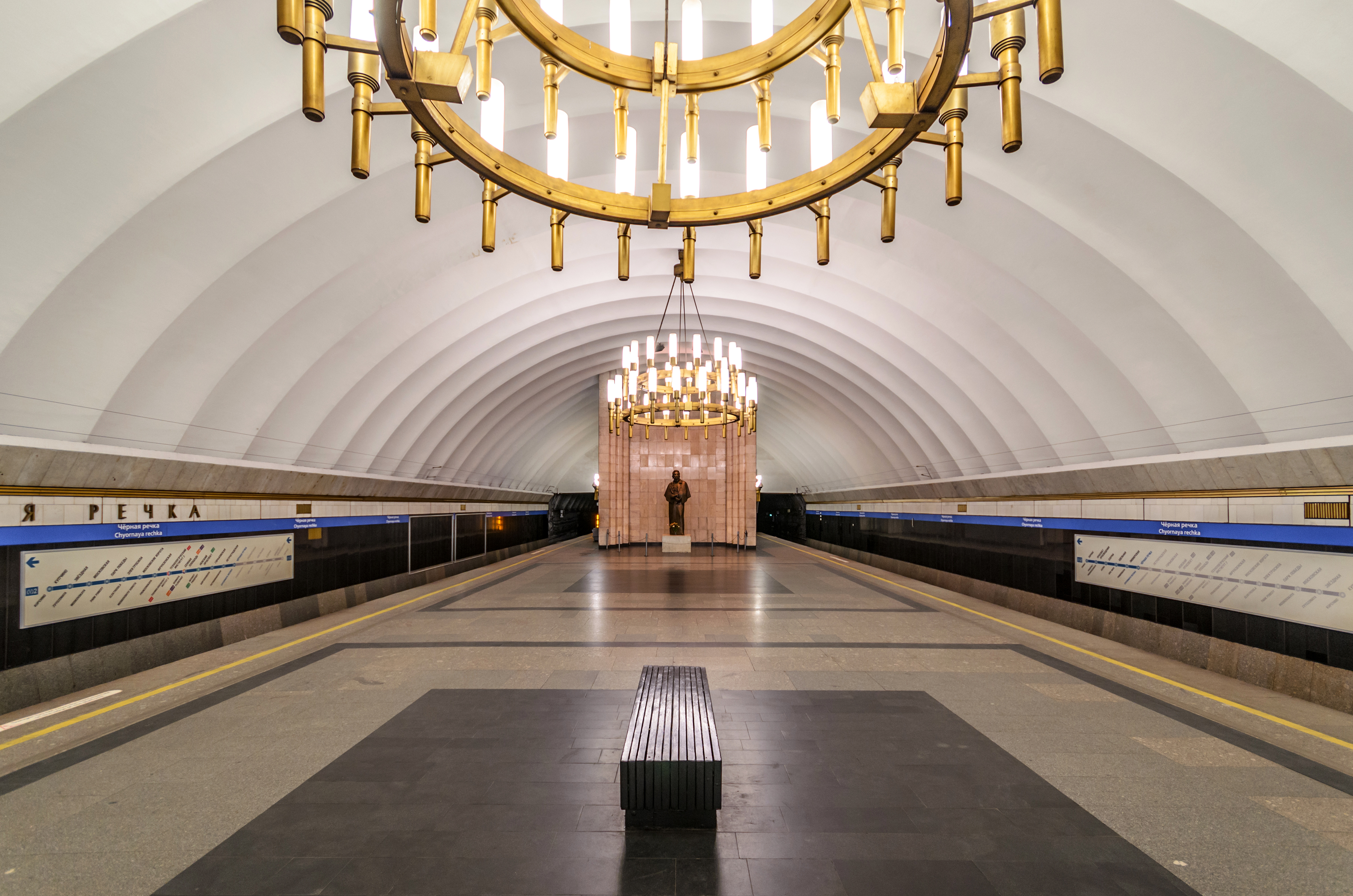
- Station Hall

General information
- Location: Primorsky District; Saint Petersburg; Russia
- Coordinates: 59°59′08″N 30°18′03″E
- System: Saint Petersburg Metro station
- Owner: Saint Petersburg Metro
- Line: Moskovsko–Petrogradskaya Line
- Platforms: 1 (Island platform)
- Tracks: 2

Construction
- Structure type: Underground

Other information
- Station code: 16

History
- Opened: 1982-11-04
- Electrified: Third rail

Services
Preceding station	Saint Petersburg Metro	Following station
Pionerskaya towards Parnas	Line 2	Petrogradskaya towards Kupchino
Route map
Location

Chyornaya Rechka (Russian: Чёрная рéчка, "Black stream") is a station of the Saint Petersburg Metro which opened on 4 November 1982.

The station named in honour of the place of the last duel of Russian poet Alexander Pushkin.

== Gallery ==
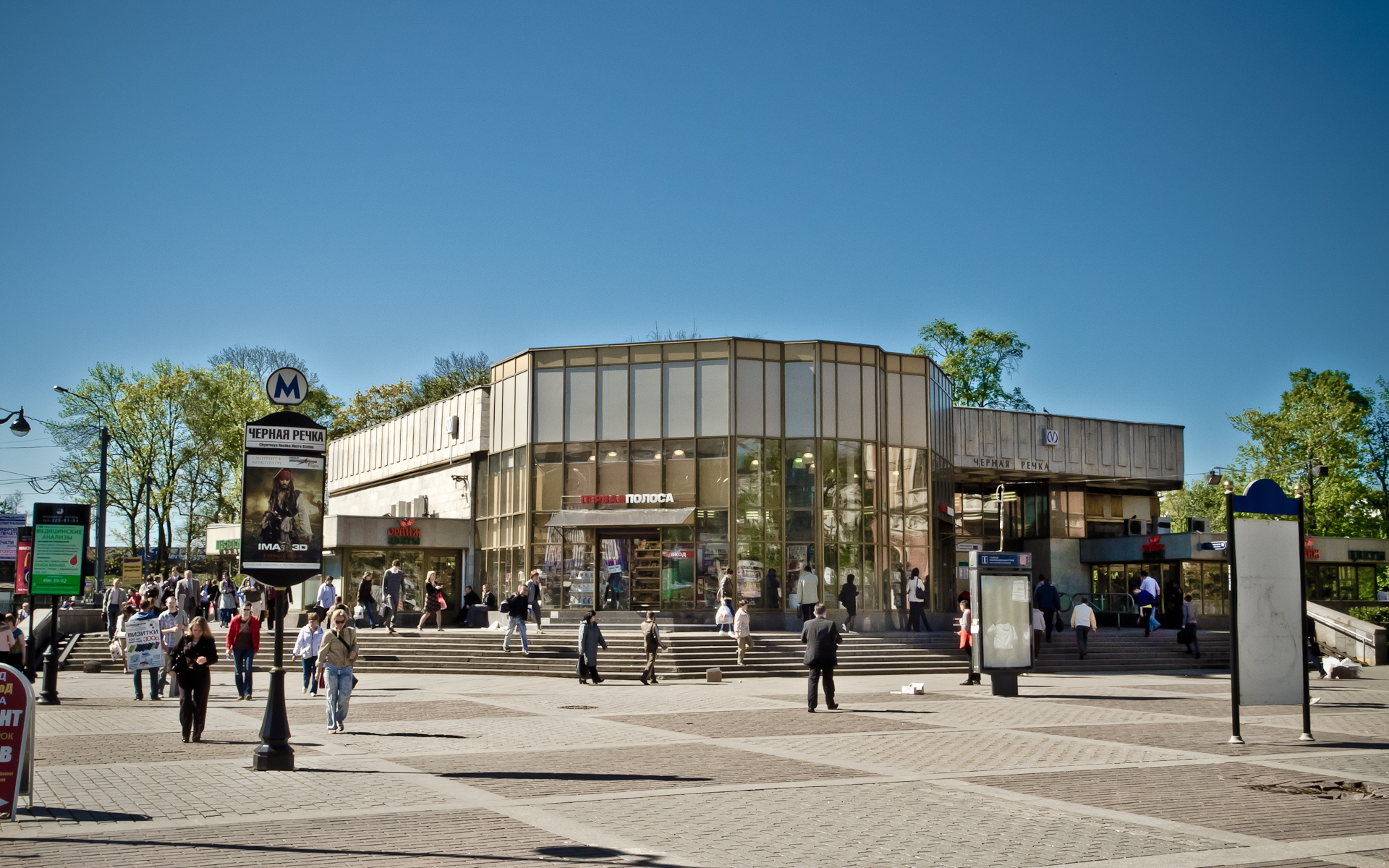
Chyornaya Rechka pavilion

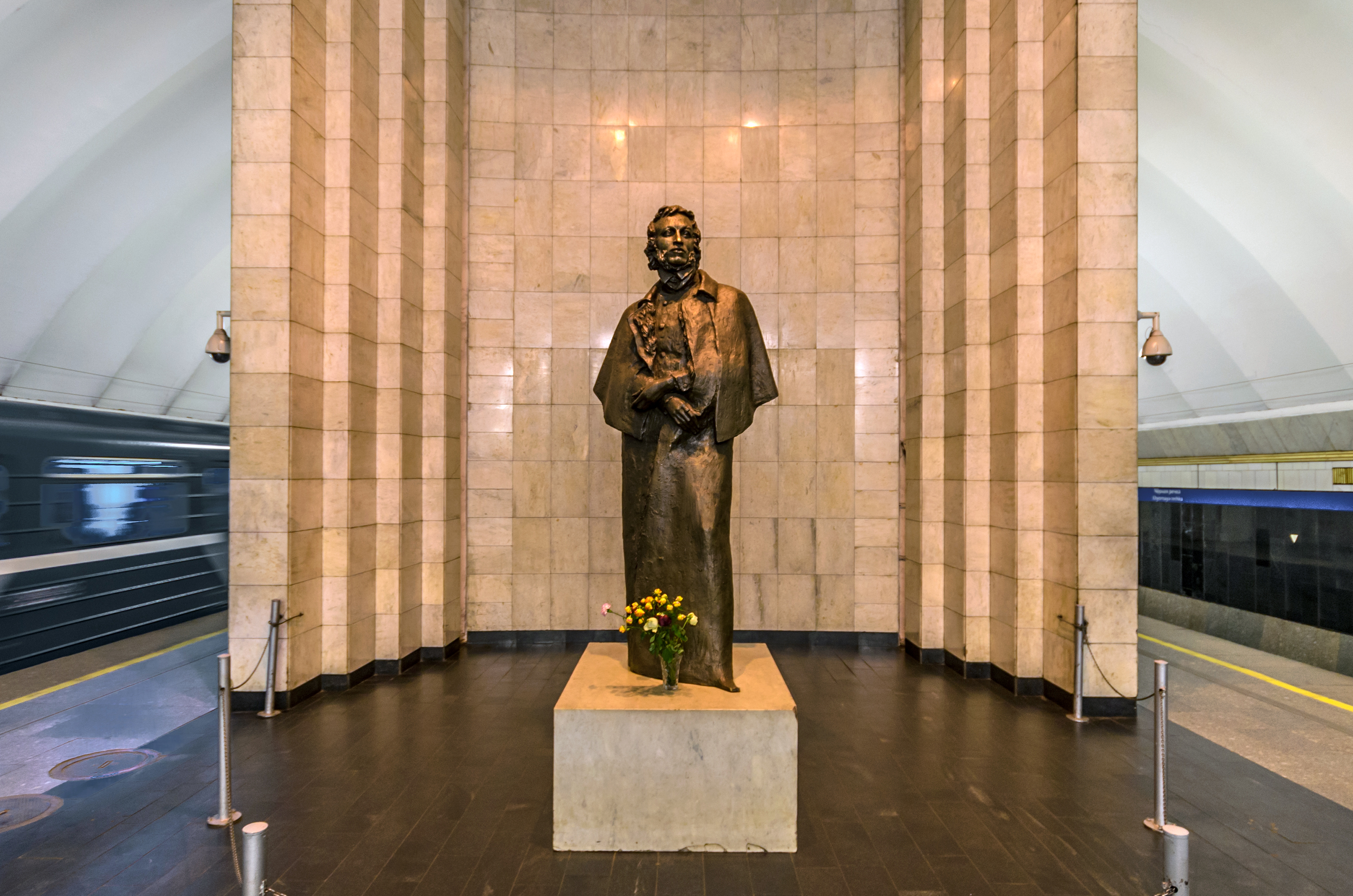
The monument to Alexander Pushkin
