= Petrogradskaya (Saint Petersburg Metro) =

Saint Petersburg Metro Station

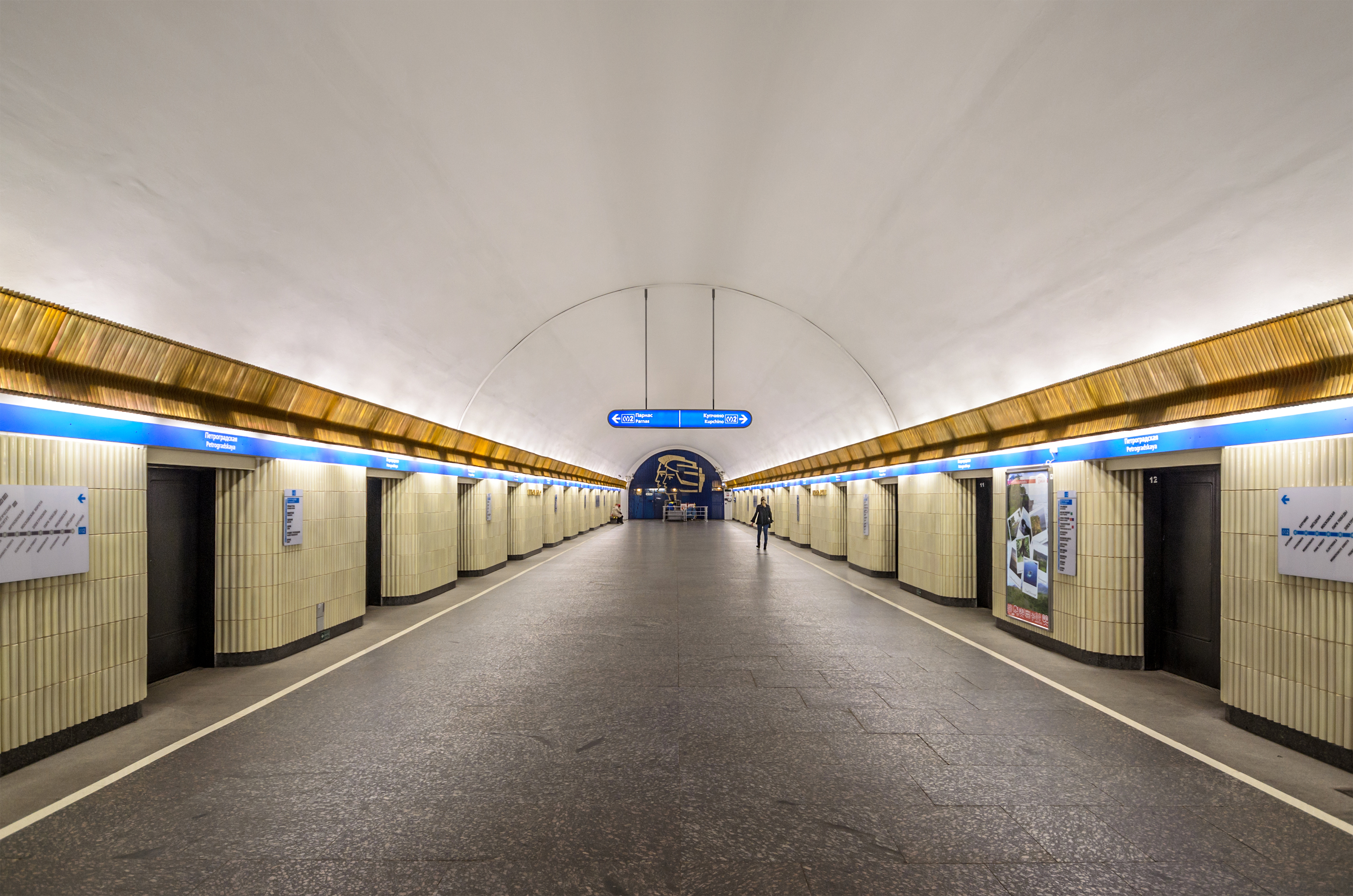
- Station Hall

General information
- Location: Petrogradsky District; Saint Petersburg; Russia
- Coordinates: 59°57′59″N 30°18′41″E
- System: Saint Petersburg Metro station
- Owner: Saint Petersburg Metro
- Line: Moskovsko–Petrogradskaya Line
- Platforms: 1 (Island platform)
- Tracks: 2

Construction
- Structure type: Underground
- Depth: 67 m (220 ft)
- Platform levels: 1
- Parking: No
- Cycle facilities: Yes

History
- Opened: July 1, 1963
- Closed: October 2012 - October 2013 (Reconstruction)
- Electrified: DC 825 V

Passengers
- Several 100,000 per day

Services
Preceding station	Saint Petersburg Metro	Following station
Chyornaya Rechka towards Parnas	Line 2	Gorkovskaya towards Kupchino
Route map
Location

Petrogradskaya (Russian: Петрогра́дская) is a station on the Moskovsko-Petrogradskaya Line of the Saint Petersburg Metro.

The station was opened on July 1, 1963. Its name was derived from its location on Petrogradskaya Storona and within the Petrogradsky district.

The ground vestibule was designed by architects Andreev and Moskalenko and is located in the building of "Dom mod" ("House of Fashions"), at the intersection of Kamennoostrovsky Prospect and Bolshoy Prospect of Petrogradskaya Storona, near Leon Tolstoy Square. There is an underground slope leading to a pedestrian subway, which originally had escalators but were later dismantled.

Petrogradskaya is a deep-level station with platform screen doors. It is located at a depth of 53 metres (174 ft). The underground hall was designed by architects Belov, Govorkovsky, Rivin, Tregubov, and Shimakovsky. Crimped surface of the walls is tiled with ceramics. The rear wall features a panel against a blue grating background, depicting profiles of a worker and a kolkhoz woman, symbolizing the revolutionary spirit of Petrograd.

According to the most recent version of the system expansion plan, Petrogratskaya will become a transfer station, connected to the future Koltsevaya Line.

From January 5, 2013, till November 2013, the station was closed for capital repair.

== Literature ==
- Петербургский метрополитен: от идеи до воплощения. Альбом-каталог (in Russian). СПб.: ГМИСПб. 2005. ISBN 5-902671-21-3.
- Гарюгина, В. А., ed. (1995). Metropolitan of the Northern Capital 1955-1995 Метрополитен Северной Столицы (Альбом) (in Russian). СПб.: Лики Росиии. ISBN 5-87417-020-0.
