= Kupchino =

Kupchino may refer to:

- Kupchino (Saint Petersburg Metro), a station of the Saint Petersburg Metro, St. Petersburg, Russia
- Kupchino Municipal Okrug, a municipal okrug of Frunzensky District of the federal city of St. Petersburg, Russia
