= Sennaya Ploshchad =

Sennaya Ploshchad:

- Sennaya Square or Sennaya Ploshchad, St. Petersburg
- Sennaya Ploshchad (Nizhny Novgorod)
- Sennaya Ploshchad (Veliky Novgorod)
- Sennaya Ploshchad (Moscow)
- Smolenskaya-Sennaya Square
- Sennaya Ploshchad (Saint Petersburg Metro)
- Sennaya Ploshchad (Nizhny Novgorod Metro)
