= Sennaya Ploshchad (Saint Petersburg Metro) =

Saint Petersburg Metro Station

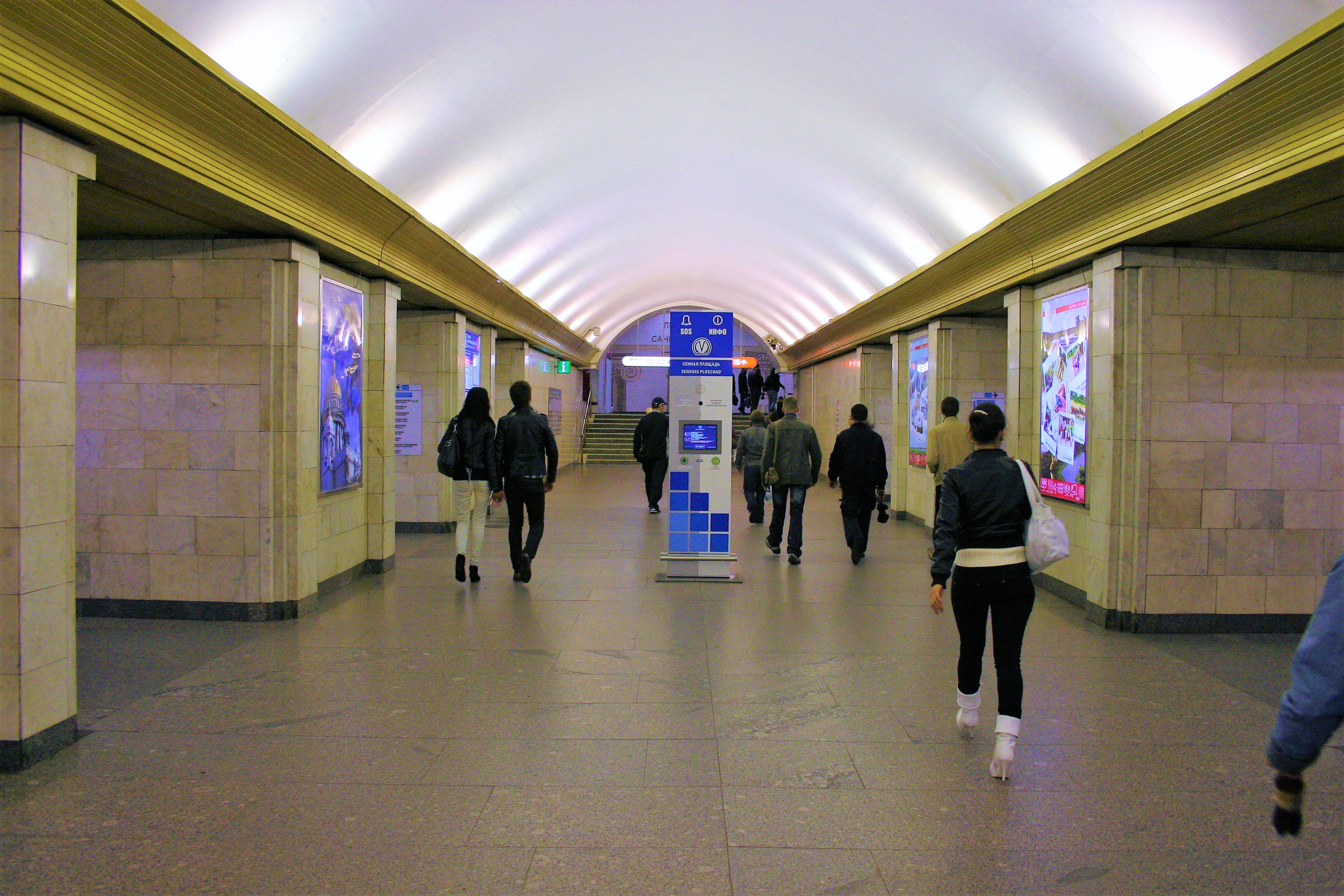
- Station Hall

General information
- Location: Admiralteysky District; Saint Petersburg; Russia
- Coordinates: 59.9271°N 30.3203°E
- System: Saint Petersburg Metro station
- Owner: Saint Petersburg Metro
- Line: Moskovsko–Petrogradskaya Line
- Platforms: 1 (Island platform)
- Tracks: 2

Construction
- Structure type: Underground

History
- Opened: 1 July 1963
- Electrified: Third rail
- Former names: Ploshchad Mira

Services
Preceding station	Saint Petersburg Metro	Following station
Nevsky Prospekt towards Parnas	Line 2	Tekhnologichesky Institut towards Kupchino
Terminus	Line 4 transfer at Spasskaya	Dostoyevskaya towards Ulitsa Dybenko
Admiralteyskaya towards Komendantsky Prospekt	Line 5 transfer at Sadovaya	Zvenigorodskaya towards Shushary
Route map
Location

Sennaya Ploshchad (Russian: Сеннáя плóщадь, IPA: [sʲɪˈnːajə ˈploɕːɪtʲ]; named after Sennaya Square) is a station on the Moskovsko-Petrogradskaya Line of Saint Petersburg Metro.

== History ==
The station opened on 1 July 1963. It is a deep underground pylon station. Its surface vestibule is situated near Sennaya Square, which gives its name to the station. The historic Saviour Church on Sennaya Square was demolished in 1961 prior to the construction of the vestibule, although it ended up located in a different place. In 1952, Sennaya Square was renamed Ploshchad Mira and the new station was given that name. The historic name of the square was restored in 1992, and the metro station was also renamed. In June 1999, the concrete canopy of the surface vestibule collapsed, killing seven. The station is connected to the station Spasskaya of the Pravoberezhnaya Line and Sadovaya of the Frunzensko-Primorskaya Line via an underground transfer corridor.

On 3 April 2017, a suicide bomber blew himself up on a train between stations Sennaya Ploschad and Tekhnologichesky Institut, leaving 15 people dead and at least 45 people injured.
