= Prospekt Prosvescheniya (Saint Petersburg Metro) =

Saint Petersburg Metro Station

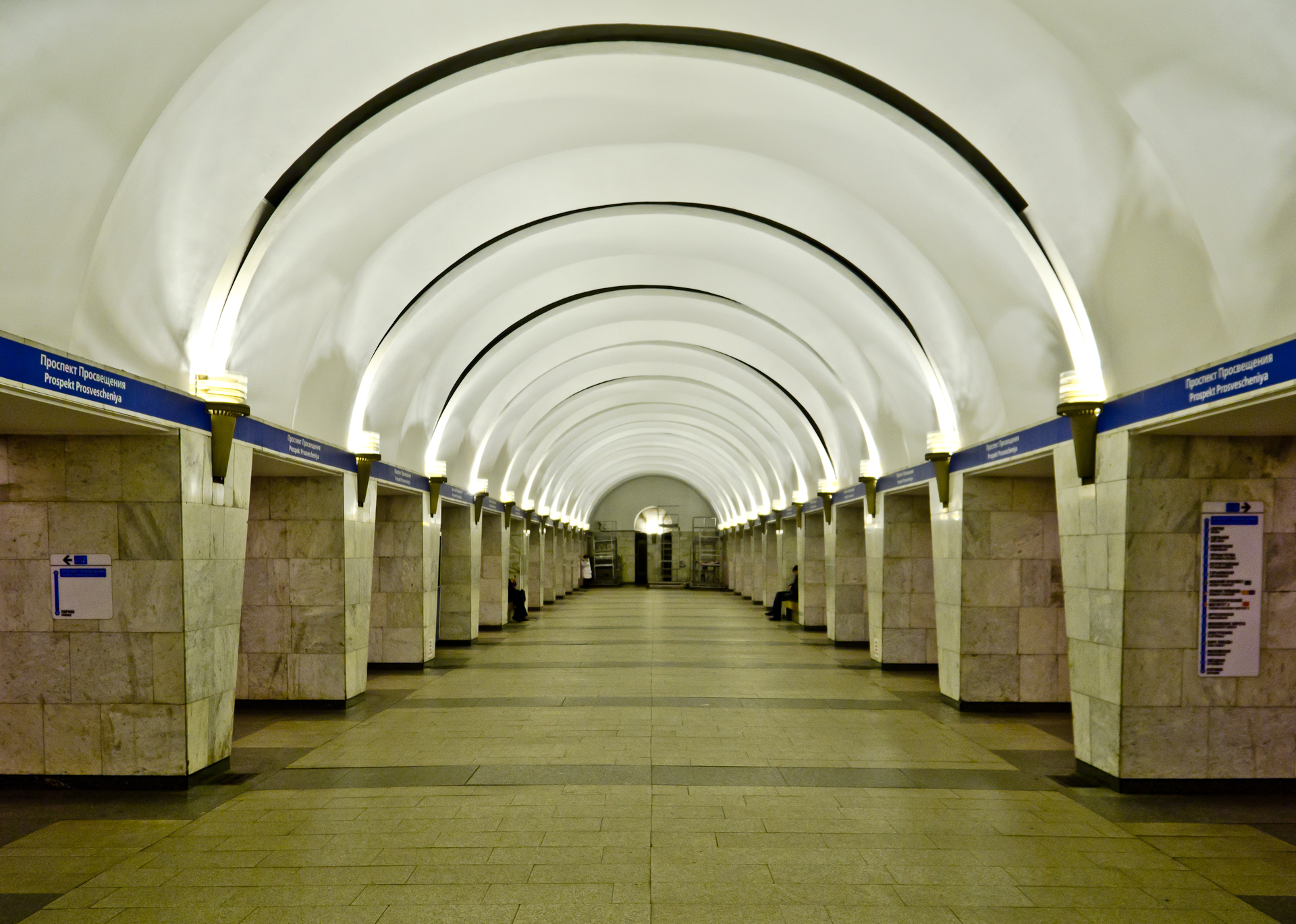
- Station Hall

General information
- Location: Vyborgsky District; Saint Petersburg; Russia
- Coordinates: 60°3′5.19″N 30°19′56.96″E
- System: Saint Petersburg Metro station
- Operator: Saint Petersburg Metro
- Line: Moskovsko–Petrogradskaya Line
- Platforms: 1 (Island platform)
- Tracks: 2

Construction
- Structure type: Underground
- Depth: 65 m (213 ft)
- Platform levels: 1
- Parking: Yes
- Cycle facilities: Yes

Other information
- Station code: 12 23

History
- Opened: 1988-08-19
- Electrified: Third rail 825 V DC

Services
Preceding station	Saint Petersburg Metro	Following station
Parnas Terminus	Line 2	Ozerki towards Kupchino
Location

Prospekt Prosvescheniya (Russian: Проспéкт Просвещéния, Education avenue) is a station of the Saint Petersburg Metro located between stations Ozerki and Parnas. It took its name from a nearby avenue. It was opened on 19 August 1988.

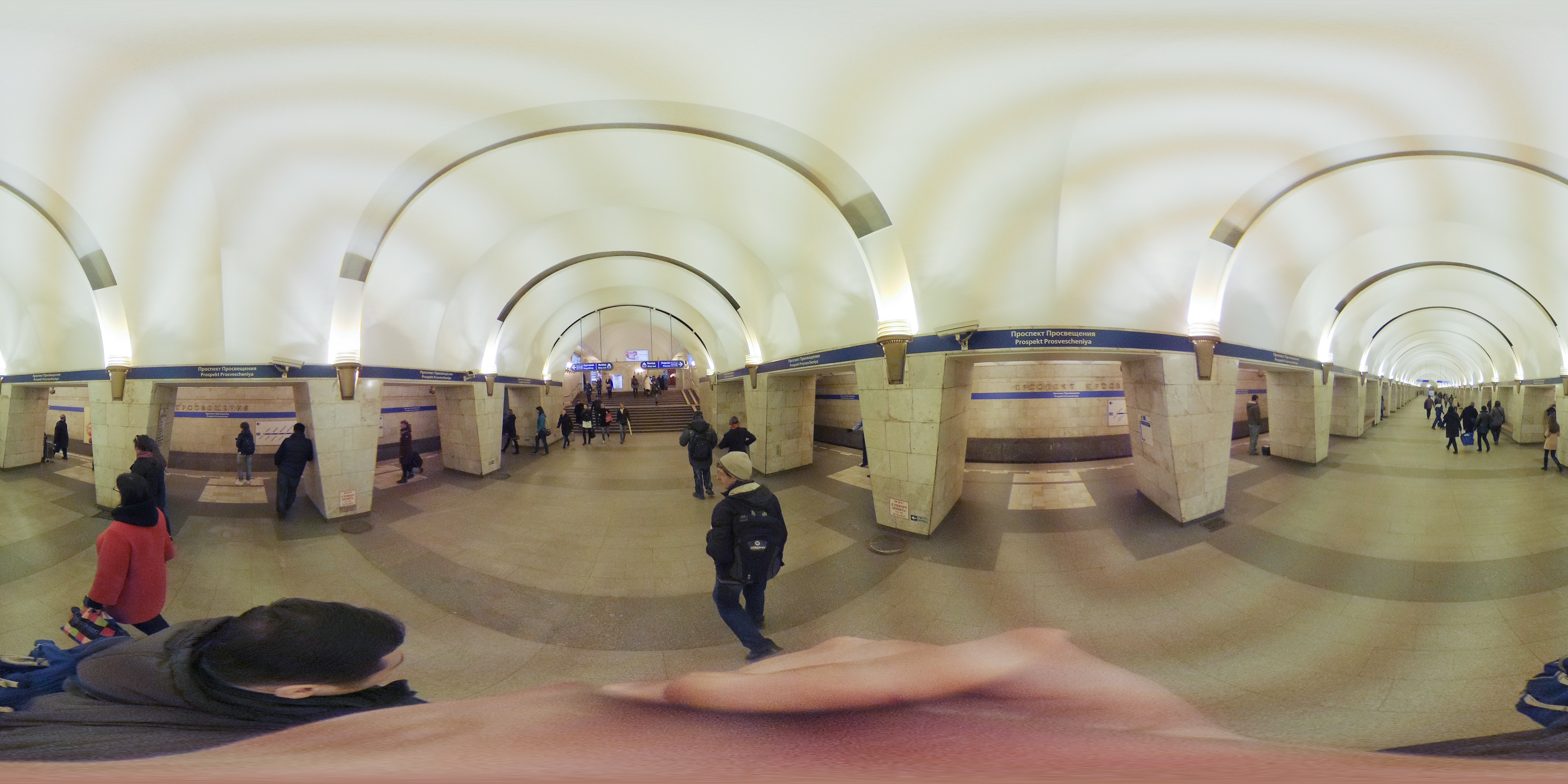
Central hall of Prospekt Prosvescheniya station (view as a 360° interactive panorama)
