= 2017 Saint Petersburg Metro bombing =

Terrorist attack in Russia

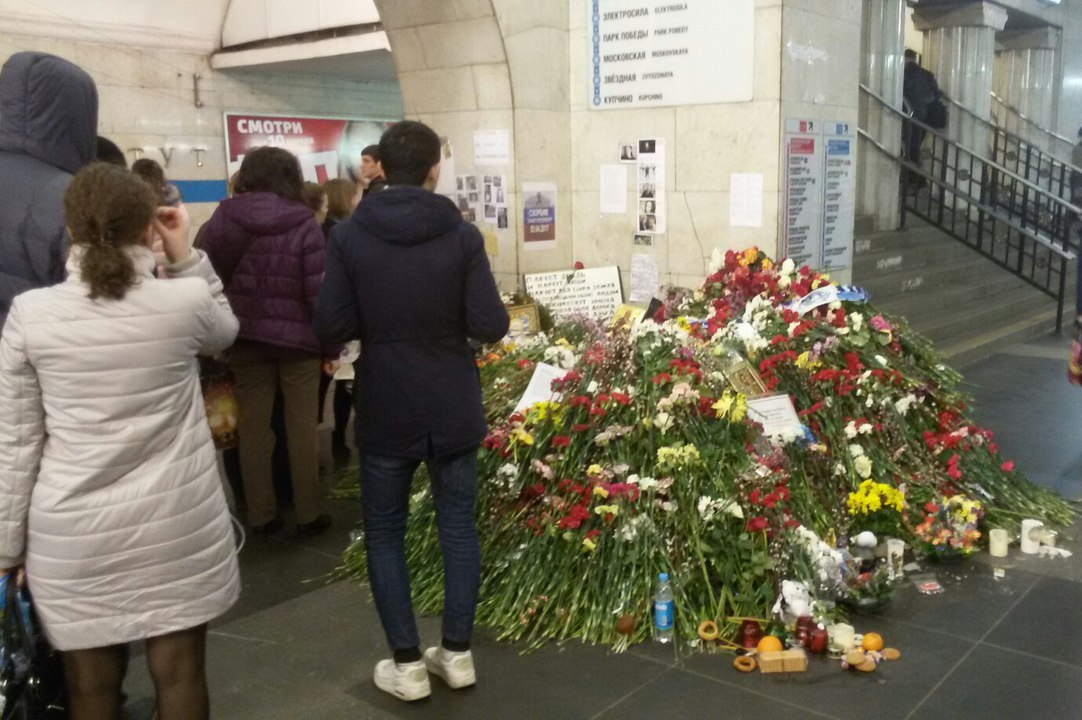
- Memorial of flowers at the metro station Tekhnologichesky Institut after terrorist attack 2017 Saint Petersburg Metro bombing (Central Saint Petersburg) 2017 Saint Petersburg Metro bombing (European Russia)
- Location: 59°54′59″N 30°19′07″E; On a Saint Petersburg Metro train between Sennaya Ploshchad and Tekhnologichesky Institut stations, Saint Petersburg, Russia
- Date: 3 April 2017; 9 years ago 14:40 (FET; UTC+3)
- Target: Civilians
- Attack type: Suicide bombing; terrorist attack
- Weapon: Nail bomb
- Deaths: 16 (including the perpetrator)
- Injuries: 64
- Perpetrator: Imam Shamil Battalion
- Assailant: Akbarzhon Jalilov
- Motive: Islamic extremism

On 3 April 2017, a terrorist attack using an explosive device took place on the Saint Petersburg Metro between Sennaya Ploshchad and Tekhnologichesky Institut stations. Eleven people (including the perpetrator) were initially reported to have died, and five more died later from their injuries, bringing the total to 15.

At least 45 others were injured in the incident. The explosive device was contained in a briefcase. A second explosive device was found and defused at Ploshchad Vosstaniya metro station. The suspected perpetrator was named as Akbarzhon Jalilov, a Russian citizen who was an ethnic Uzbek born in Kyrgyzstan.

== Background ==
In 2016, ISIL had plotted to target St. Petersburg due to Russia's military involvement in Syria, resulting in arrests. No public transport system in Russia had been bombed since the 2010 Moscow Metro bombings.

ISIL propaganda was being circulated prior to this incident. It encouraged supporters to launch strikes on Moscow. ISIL propaganda showed bullet holes through Putin's head and a poster circulated before the attack of a falling Kremlin and included the message "We Will Burn Russia." However, as some researchers have said, Russia faces a "sophisticated and complex" threat from domestic terrorism, linked to many different groups.

Vladimir Putin was visiting Saint Petersburg, where he was born, on the day of the attack.

== Attack ==
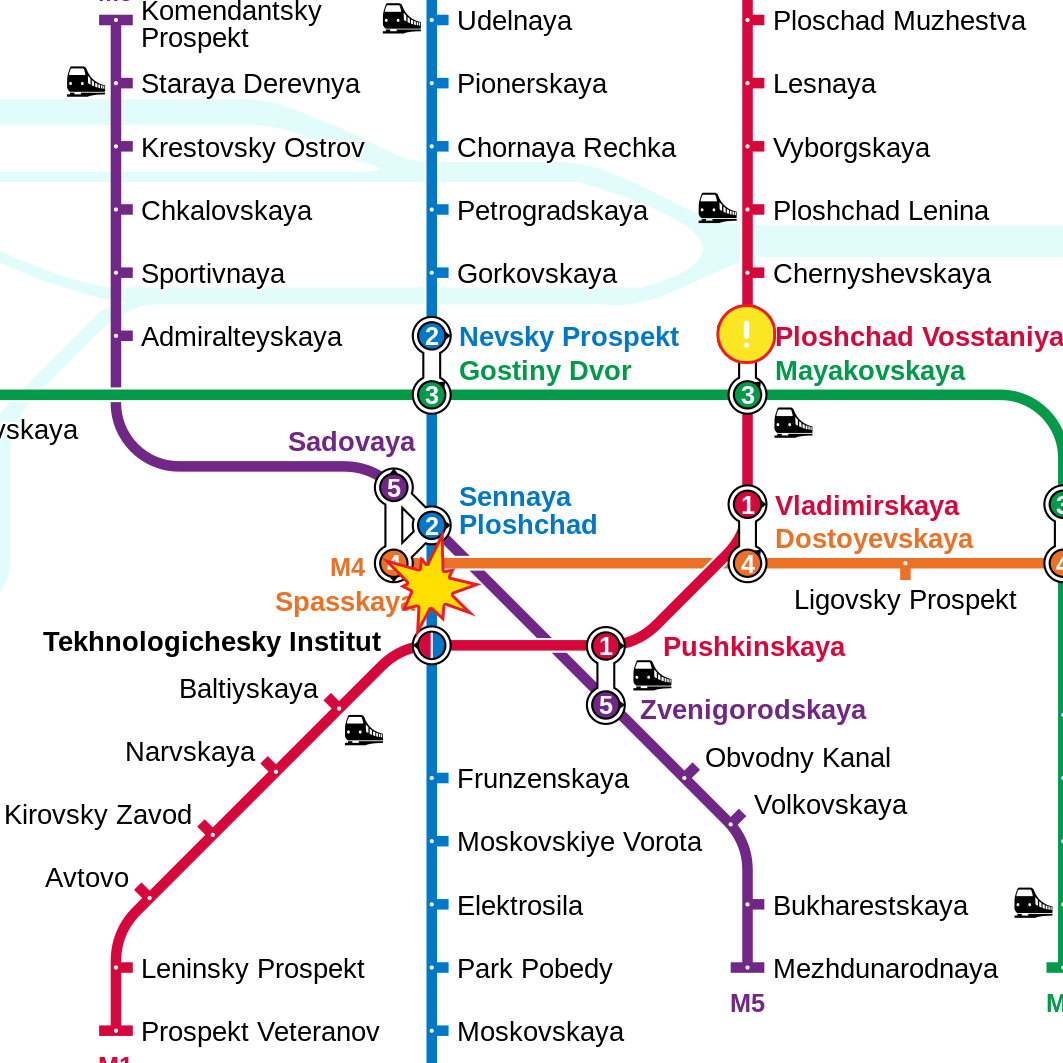
Location of the two stations and the tunnel in the Saint Petersburg Metro where the explosion occurred.

On 3 April 2017, a device containing 200–300 grams (0.44–0.66 lb) of explosives detonated on a train travelling through a tunnel between the Sennaya Ploshchad and Tekhnologichesky Institut stations of the Saint Petersburg Metro. According to a statement from the Ministry of Emergency Situations, the bomb was detonated on the third carriage of the train. Eyewitnesses said the blast occurred near the door. Immediately after the explosion, smoke filled the platform. Video from social media showed multiple victims on the platform and a metal door twisted by the force of the blast. Following reports of the explosion, all metro stations in Saint Petersburg were quickly closed. In the late evening, metro services were resumed on Lines 3, 4, and 5.

A second bomb was discovered and disarmed at Ploshchad Vosstaniya station. The device had ball bearings, screws, and shrapnel and was hidden within a fire extinguisher containing an equivalent of about 1 kilogram (2.2 lb) of TNT. Jalilov's DNA was found on a bag which contained the extinguisher, suggesting that he intentionally left this bag inside a carriage as witnessed by some passengers.

== Aftermath ==
Security was heightened after the attack. Metal detectors, installed countrywide following another metro attack seven years before, were all implemented after not having been in use for several years. The Moscow Metro security department said they were ready to assist the Saint Petersburg Metro in case of any help being needed. Local media reported that authorities had found suspicious packages in three Moscow metro stations, Nagatinskaja, Savelovskaya and Ugrezhskaya (CIP). Authorities later cordoned off the area. The security of Pulkovo International Airport was also heightened in response to the blast. A possible suspect was sighted on Metro surveillance cameras, according to unconfirmed reports. The Investigative Committee of Russia said the train operator's decision to drive it to the next station helped to avoid an even higher number of casualties.

Because of the terrorist attack, security measures were also strengthened in the Nizhny Novgorod metro.

Two weeks later, FSB released a statement says that Russian security operatives have detained Abror Azimov (born 1990), the alleged mastermind of the bombing, in Moscow in which he trained the suicide attacker.

== Casualties ==
Fifteen people died due to the attack, of whom ten during the attack and five later from their injuries. As reported by the Russian Ministry of Health, 64 people were injured. Thirty-nine people were hospitalised, of whom six had critical injuries. Children were among those injured.

The fifteen people killed were identified as thirteen Russian citizens, a Kazakh man and an Azerbaijani woman.

== Perpetrator ==
The suspected perpetrator behind the attacks was identified by Kyrgyzstan and Russian intelligence services as Akbarzhon Jalilov (sometimes spelled Akbarjon Djalilov), an ethnic Uzbek 22-year-old Kyrgyz-born Russian citizen.

Jalilov was born in 1995 in Osh, Kyrgyzstan, and arrived in Moscow around 2011. According to Russian newspaper Moskovskij Komsomolets, Gazeta.ru reported he had worked as a cook at a sushi bar in 2015, while other sources claimed Jalilov had worked in a garage before disappearing weeks prior to the attack. Interfax said authorities believe he had ties to radical Islamic groups. Russian media has reported that he travelled to Syria in 2014 and trained with Islamic State militants. On 26 April, a group called the Imam Shamil Battalion claimed responsibility for the attack, and said that the bomber was acting on orders from al-Qaeda. The statement, posted by SITE Intelligence Group, said the bomber, Akbarzhon Jalilov, had acted on instructions from al-Qaeda leader Ayman al-Zawahiri. In considering the incident, researchers had already illustrated that 'analysis should not focus exclusively on recent developments and Daesh', but rather look at the 'broader context' including the 'range of groups with which Central Asian radicals are involved.'

=== Initial reports ===
On 3 April 2017, investigators said they believed the attack was a suicide bombing and identified a Central Asian as the suspected perpetrator. Some reports initially misidentified the suspect as a 22-year-old from Kazakhstan who was an IT student at St. Petersburg State University of Economics. He had been reported missing. This individual was later correctly identified as a victim of the attack. The suspect was later identified as a 23-year-old native of Kyrgyzstan with Russian citizenship and with links to international militant groups. A man with a beard wearing a skullcap contacted police to clear his name. Interfax later said only one person was involved. The man with the beard turned out to be a former paratrooper from Bashkortostan.

== Reactions ==
=== Domestic ===
President Vladimir Putin was in the city when the attack happened and pledged a thorough investigation. During an unrelated meeting with President of Belarus Alexander Lukashenko, Putin said they are "considering all possible causes, including terrorism." He later visited the area of the attack, which was prohibited by the Federal Protective Service due to security concerns. This information was later denied by RIA Novosti. His statement was followed by Lukashenko expressing his sadness over the bombing. Mayor of Moscow Sergey Sobyanin expressed his condolences to the victims of the attack and ordered the strengthening of security measures around the capital's transport infrastructure, according to the Mayor's and city government's Press Secretary Gulnara Penkova. Head of the Ministry of Health Veronika Skvortsova instructed federal doctors to help doctors in St. Petersburg to assist the victims.

The Head of the Chechen Republic Ramzan Kadyrov called for the identification and punishment of the perpetrators.

The All-Russian Union of Insurers said relatives of the victims will be able to receive 2.025 million rubles.

A makeshift memorial was made to honour the victims of the bombing. Saint Petersburg declared three days of mourning in response to the attack. Mayor Georgi Poltavchenko, Governor of Leningrad Alexander Drozdenko, and President Vladimir Putin visited the site and laid flowers to pay respect.

=== International ===
Condolences and sympathies for those affected were offered by several international figures, including representatives of Algeria, China, the Czech Republic, Norway, Denmark, Finland, France, Georgia, Hungary, India, Indonesia, Iran, Israel, Japan, Laos, Malaysia, Pakistan, Poland, Portugal, Singapore, Thailand, Turkey, Ukraine, the United Kingdom, the United States, Vietnam, NATO, and the European Union.

Ukraine tightened security around its metro stations in fear of an attack.

=== Other reactions ===
Tel Aviv city hall building was lit with the colours of the Russian flag. In Brussels, where a similar attack took place a year earlier, the ING Marnix building near the Throne metro station was also decorated with a moving Russian flag animation. At midnight (01:00 of April 5 in Moscow time), the lights of the Eiffel Tower were switched off to honor the victims.

The Independent reported that some supporters of ISIL on unnamed internet forums linked the attack to Russia's support of Bashar al-Assad, and shared photos and video of people injured and killed by the blast.

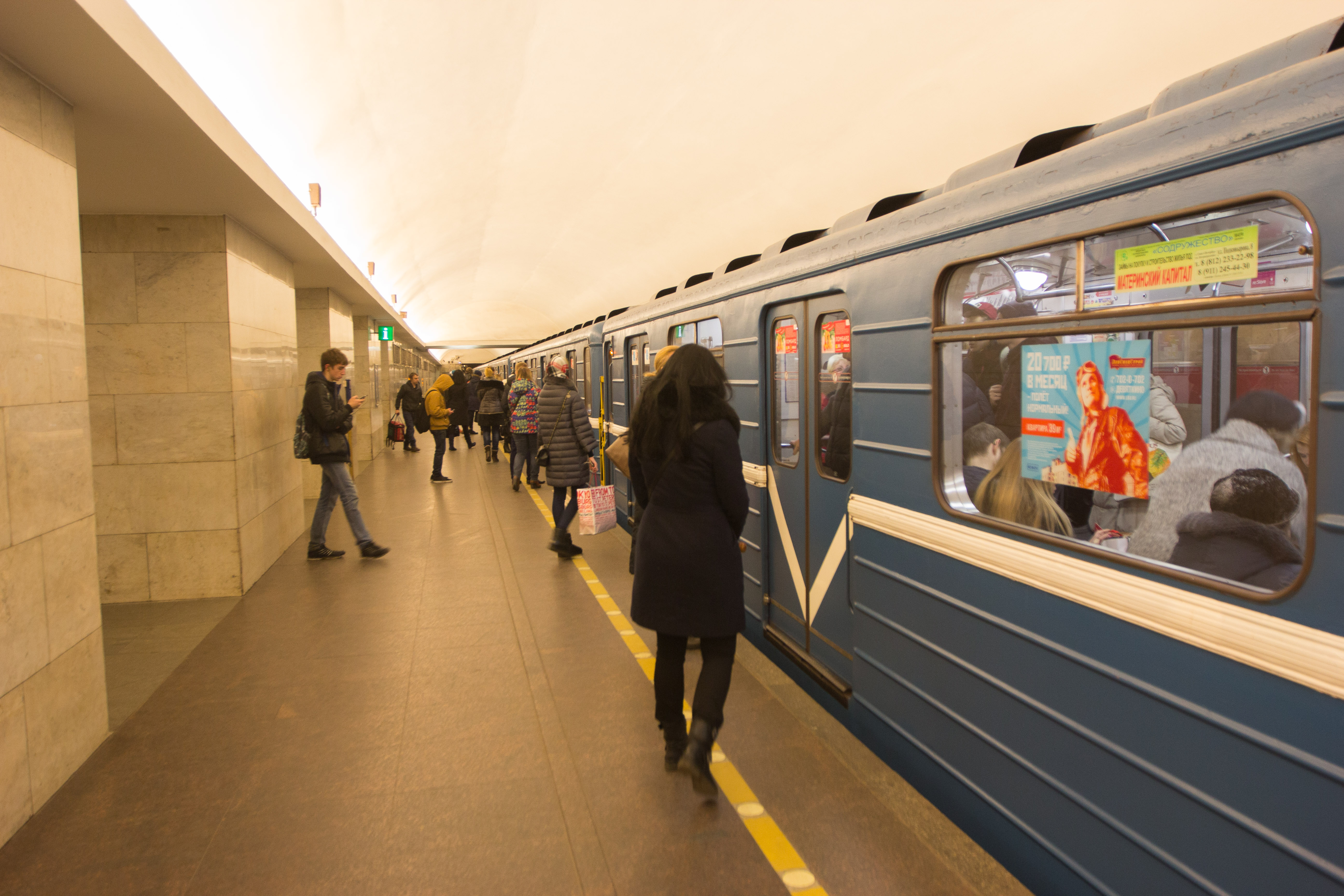
Saint Petersburg Metro station Tekhnologichesky Institut - the explosion occurred in the tunnel between it and Sennaya Ploshchad station.

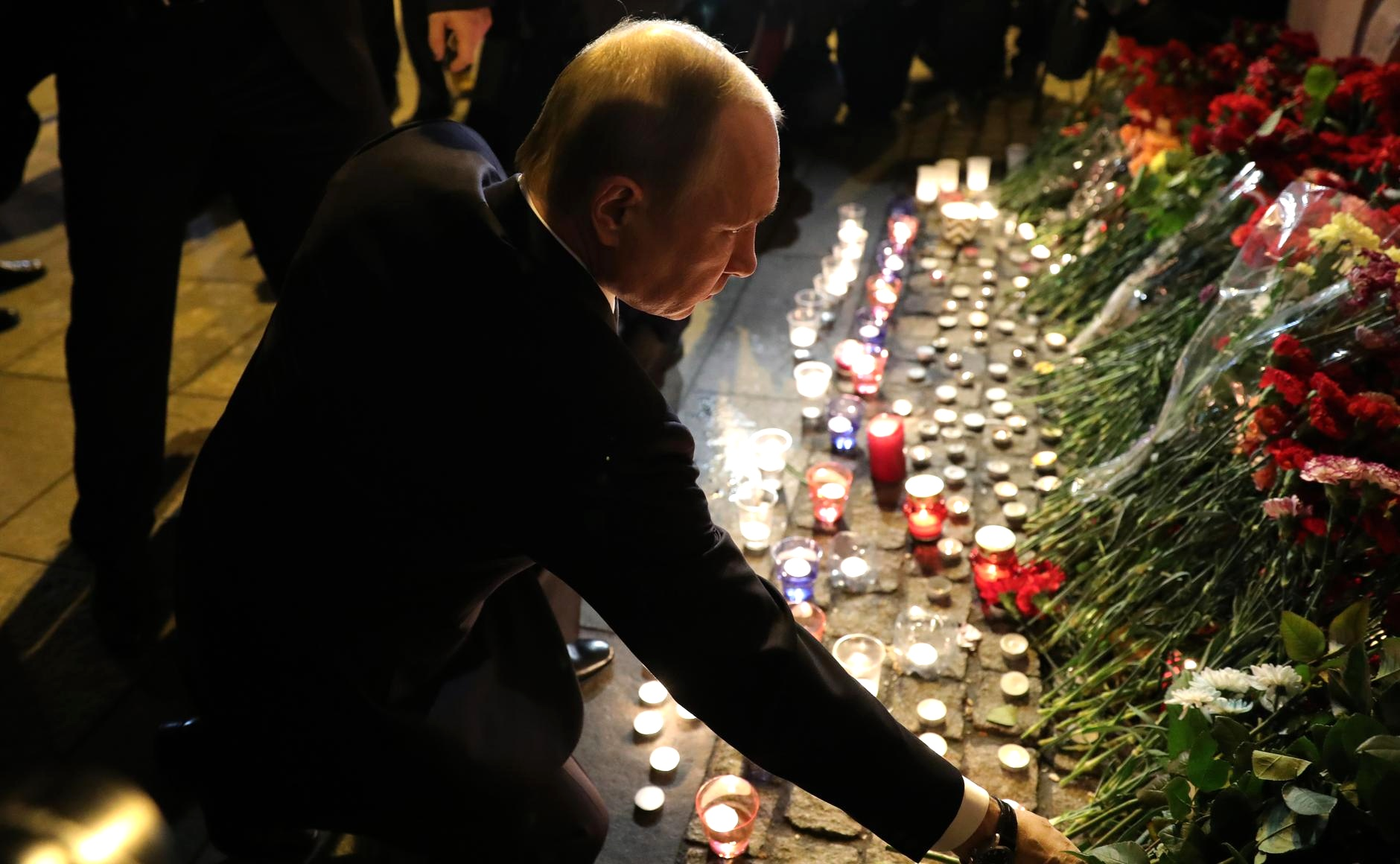
President Vladimir Putin laying flowers at the metro station

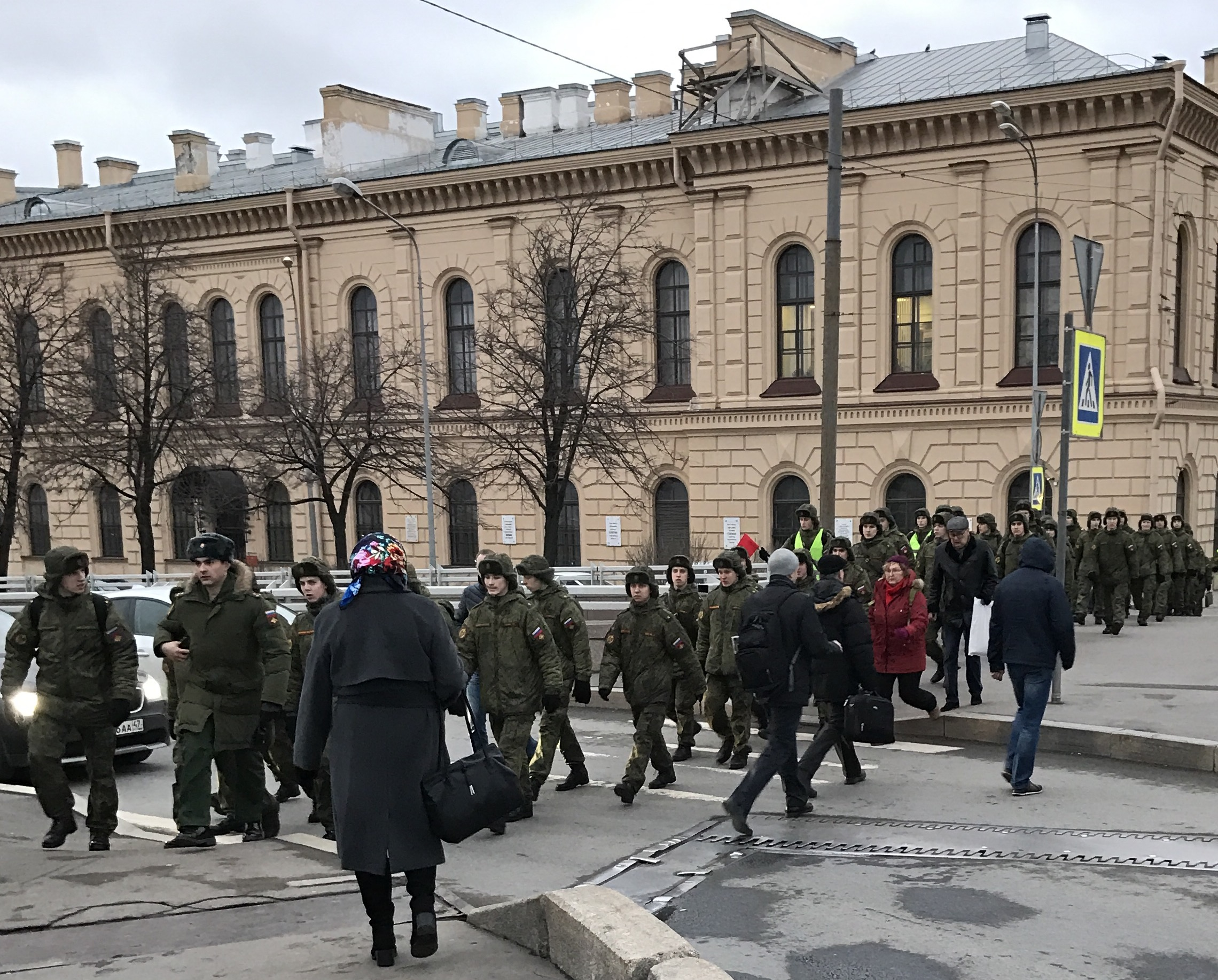
Kursants marching down the streets of Saint Petersburg after the metro bombing.

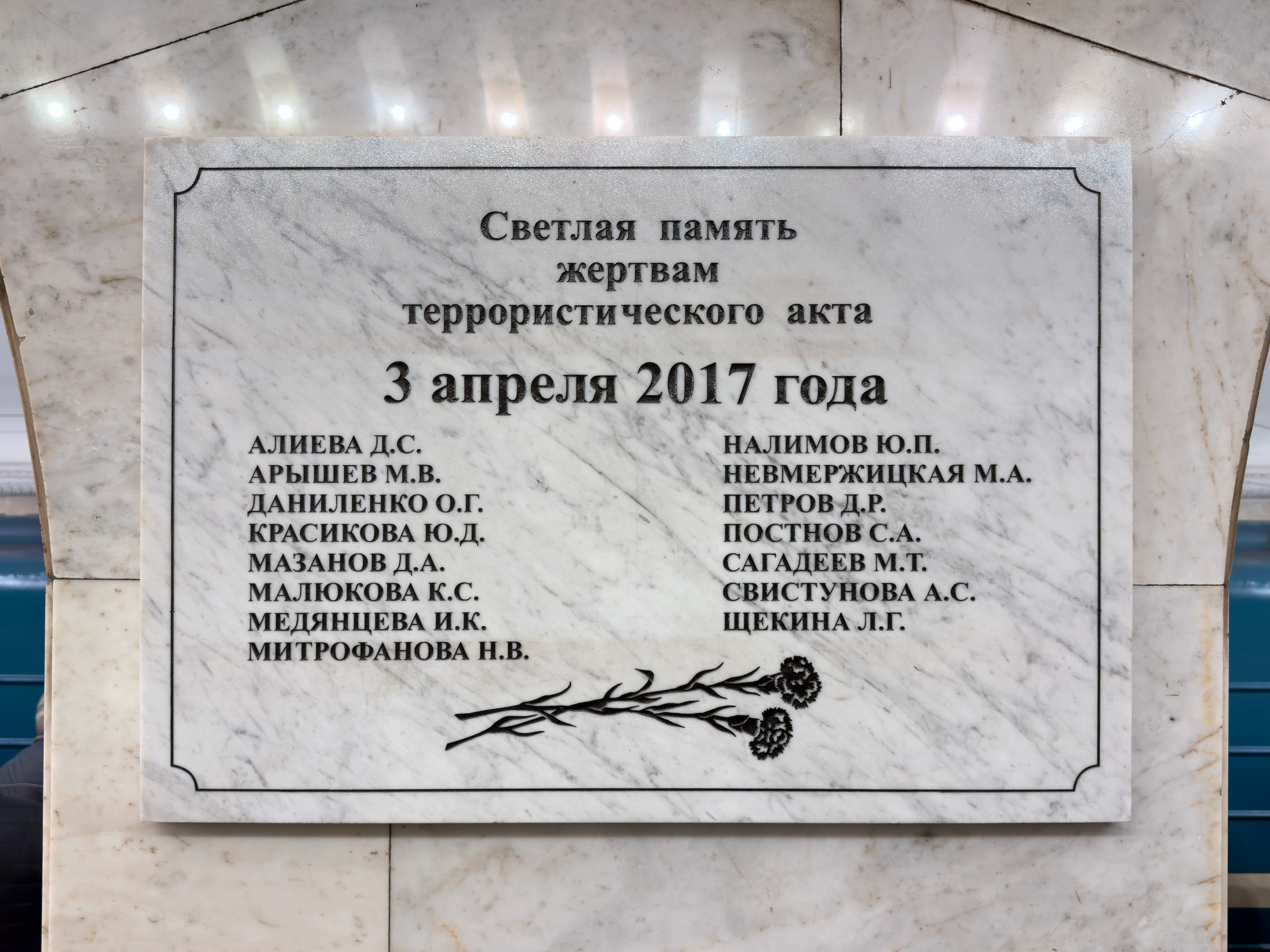
The Plaque in the Hall of Tekhnologichesky Institut Metro Station
