= Line 2 (Saint Petersburg Metro) =

Russian rapid transit line

Line 2 (Moskovsko-Petrogradskaya)

Overview
- Status: Operational
- Owner: Saint Petersburg Metro
- Termini: Parnas; Kupchino
- Stations: 18
- Color on map: Blue (#0078c9)

Service
- Type: Rapid transit
- System: Saint Petersburg Metro

History
- Opened: 29 April 1961; 65 years ago
- Last extension: 2006

Technical
- Line length: 30.1 km (18.7 mi)
- Track gauge: 1,524 mm (5 ft)

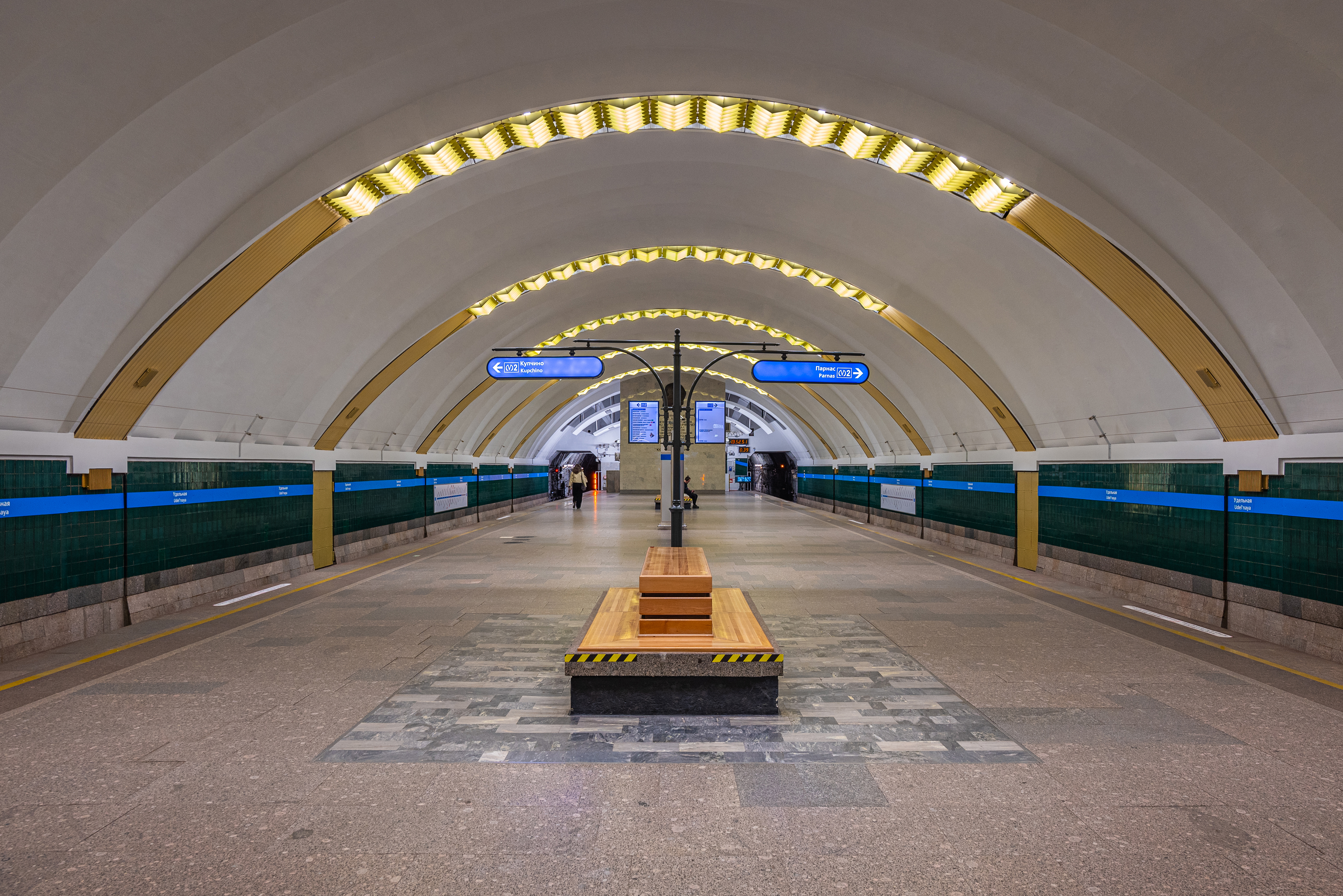
Udelnaya station

Line 2 of the Saint Petersburg Metro, also known as Moskovsko-Petrogradskaya Line (Russian: Моско́вско-Петрогра́дская ли́ния) or Blue Line, is the second oldest rapid transit line in Saint Petersburg, Russia, opened in 1961, which connects city centre with the northern and southern districts. It featured the first cross-platform transfer in the USSR. It was also the first metro line in Saint Petersburg to feature a unique platform type that soon became dubbed as "Horizontal Lift". The line cuts Saint Petersburg on a north-south axis and is generally coloured blue on Metro maps. In 2006, as an extension was opened, it became the longest line on the system.

== Timeline ==
Segment	Date opened	Length
Tekhnologichesky Institut to Park Pobedy	29 April 1961	5.5 km
Tekhnologichesky Institut to Petrogradskaya	1 July 1963	6.0 km
Park Pobedy to Moskovskaya	25 December 1969	1.7 km
Moskovskaya to Kupchino	25 December 1972	4.5 km
Petrogradskaya to Udelnaya	6 November 1982	6.1 km
Udelnaya to Prospekt Prosveshcheniya	19 August 1988	4.1 km
Prospekt Prosveshcheniya to Parnas	22 December 2006	2.2 km
Total:	18 Stations	30.1 km

== Name changes ==
Station	Previous name(s)	Years
Sennaya Ploshchad	Ploshchad Mira	1963–1991

== Transfers ==
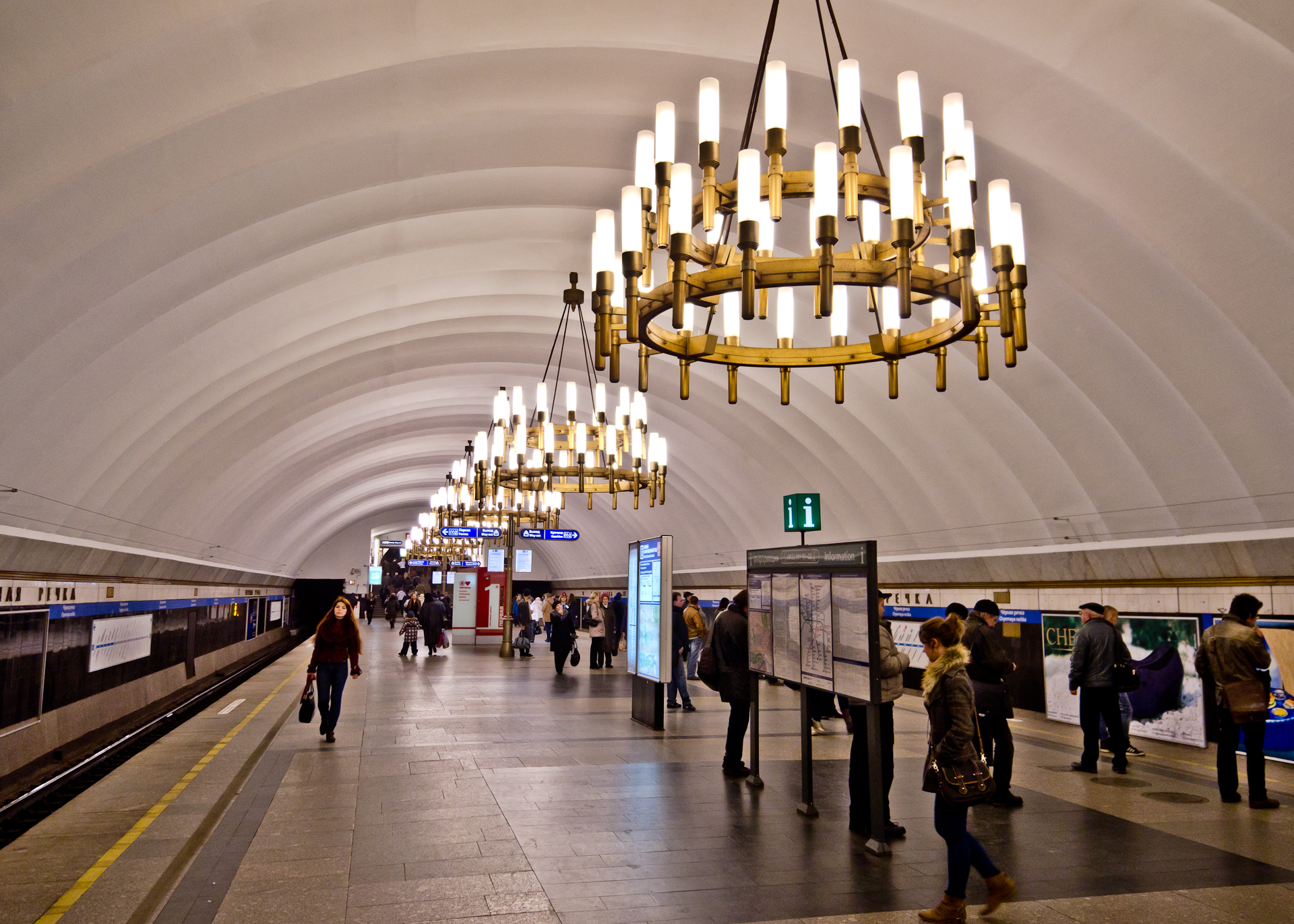
Chyornaya Rechka station

Transfer to	At
Line 1 (Saint Petersburg Metro)	Tekhnologichesky Institut
Line 3 (Saint Petersburg Metro)	Nevskiy Prospekt
Line 4 (Saint Petersburg Metro)	Sennaya Ploshchad
Line 5 (Saint Petersburg Metro)	Sennaya Ploshchad

The Tekhnologichesky Institut transfer is a cross-platform one.

== Rolling stock ==
The line is served by the Moskovskoe (№ 3) depot, and has 56 six-carriage trains assigned to it. Most of these are of type 81-717/81-714, but some are the .5 standard, built in the 1970s through the 1990s. There are also newer 81-540.1/541.1 and .9 trains running since 2000.

== Recent developments and future plans ==
The line is complete as such, and the recent extension to Parnas means that in the long future no future extensions will be built. However it is very likely that some of the central stations will be receiving much needed repairs internally and externally.
