= Parnas (Saint Petersburg Metro) =

Saint Petersburg Metro Station

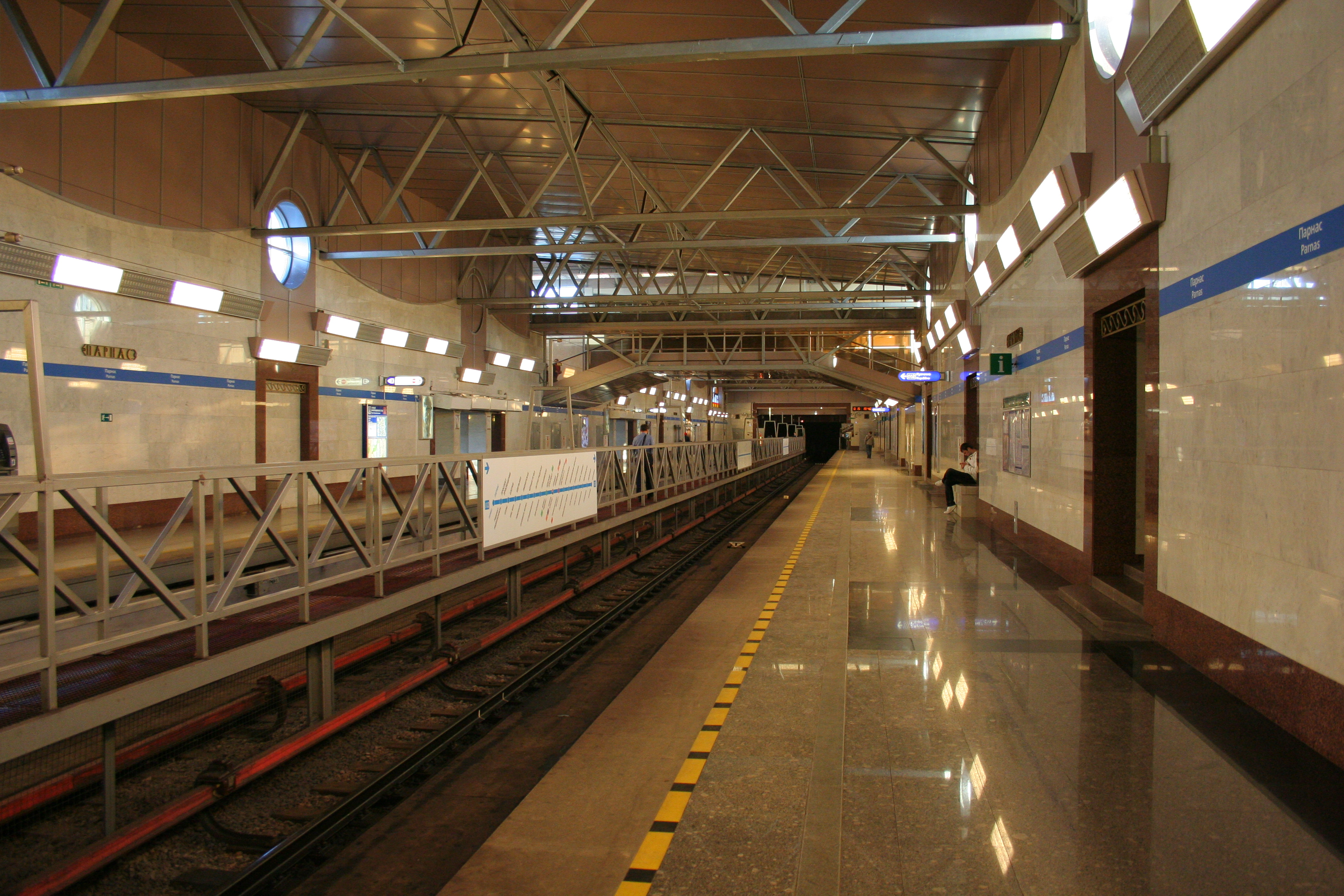
- Station Hall

General information
- Location: Vyborgsky District; Saint Petersburg; Russia
- Coordinates: 60.067978°N 30.330623°E
- System: Saint Petersburg Metro station
- Operator: Saint Petersburg Metro
- Line: Moskovsko–Petrogradskaya Line
- Platforms: 2 (Side platforms)
- Tracks: 2

Construction
- Structure type: Underground
- Depth: Above ground.

Other information
- Station code: 11

History
- Opened: 22 December 2006
- Electrified: Third rail

Services
Preceding station	Saint Petersburg Metro	Following station
Terminus	Line 2	Prospekt Prosvescheniya towards Kupchino
Location

Parnas (Russian: Парна́с) is the northern terminus of the Moskovsko-Petrogradskaya Line of the Saint Petersburg Metro. It was opened on 22 December 2006 and is located between the tunnel portal and the Vyborgskoye Metro Depot. It is the northernmost subway station in Saint Petersburg and in Russia.

The station is side-platform arrangement almost identical to the other three surface stations in the system: Kupchino, Rybatskoye and Devyatkino, which are also located between tunnel portals and their lines' depots, however unlike those stations there is no transfer to the suburban commuter trains (elektrichkas).

The station was first mentioned in 1984, as a finale of the Petrogradsky radius extension that was built throughout the 1980s from the city centre into the northern housing massifs. The northernmost end would include a second depot for the line and a surface terminus station next to a new housing massif that would be located near the industrial zones of Parnas and Shuvalovo. After the completion of the extension to Prospekt Prosvescheniya in 1988, work immediately began on the construction of the Vyborgsoye depot and 1991 the initial station was approved by the Committee on City Construction and Architecture.

Then the collapse of the Soviet Union and in the financial crises that followed most of the projects were frozen, including Parnas. Further delays were caused by the flooding of the Lesnaya-Ploshchad Muzhestva tunnel which broke off the northernmost end of the Kirovsko-Vyborgskaya Line and its important Severnoye depot with the rest of the system. As construction work was reprioritised to repair the flooded section, the void caused by the cut-off of the Severnoye depot forced the planners to return to the idea of completing the Petrogradsky radius and the Vyborgskoye depot and with it – Parnas. A new project was developed in 1995, however only a shell of the station was built when the Vyborgskoye depot opened on 1 February 2000. Finally in May 2005, after many delays, construction finally began and a year later the station was complete. The station design was modified from the original 1995 version to accommodate several modern innovations and changing system standards – most notably, it became the first station in the system to feature provisions for accessibility through elevators. Other changes included overhead crossings and usage of modern technology.

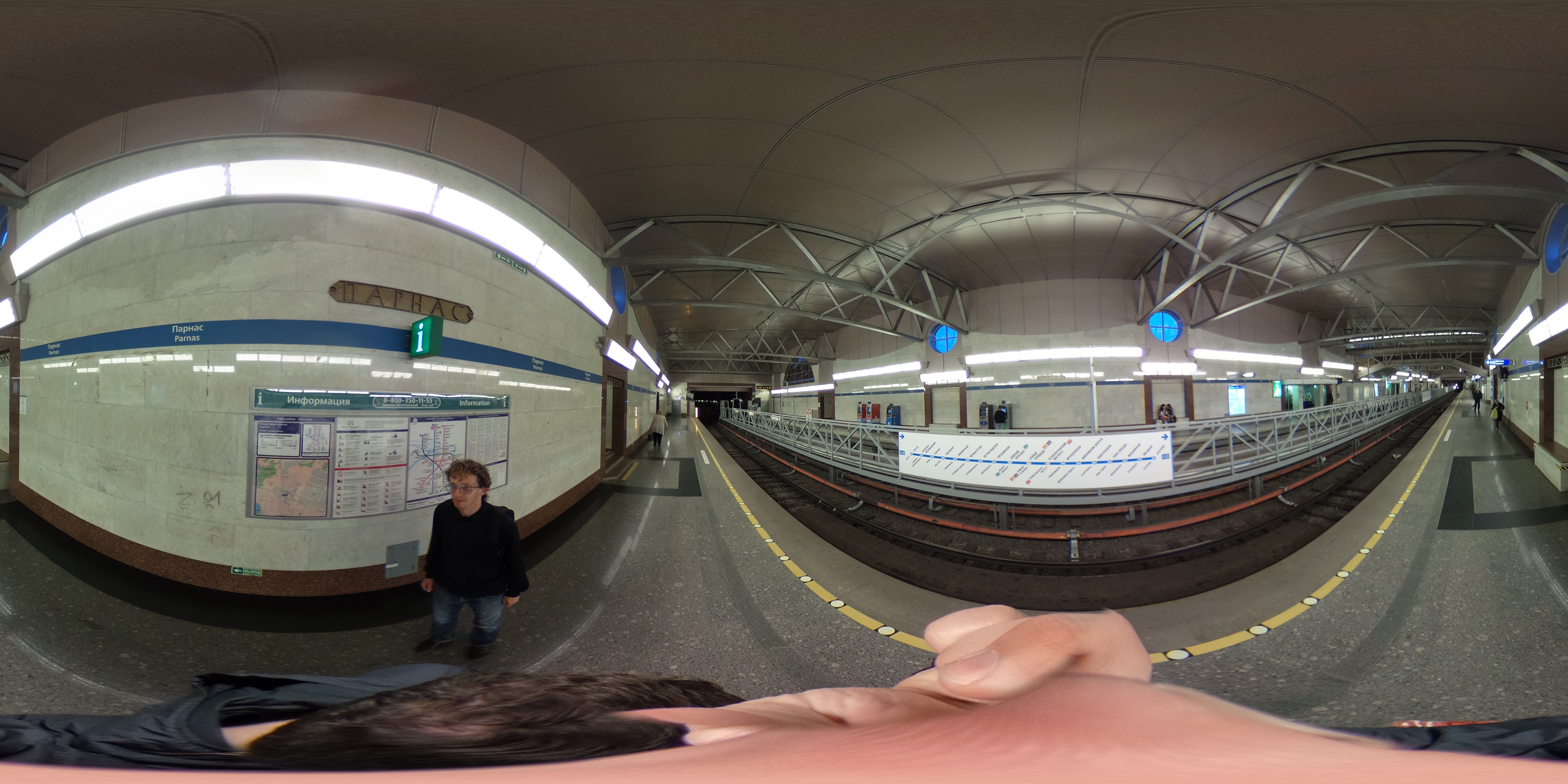
Platform hall of Parnas station (view as a 360° interactive panorama)

The station's theme is ancient Greek motives integrated into a modern "high-tech" design, which was developed by architects N.Romashkin-Timanov, M.Pavlova, V.Khilchenko. All of the station's entrances are to the north including a central vestibule. The tradition of Russian naming after regions always went in conflict on whether the station name will be rendered in the noun form like Parnas or the adjective form Parnasskaya (Парнасская). Because of this, both versions can be found in older documents and maps.

== Etymology ==
Parnas is named after a small hill in the north of the city which is surrounded by a small park. The hill is named after a hill in Greek mythology where Apollo met with the Muses.

== Gallery ==
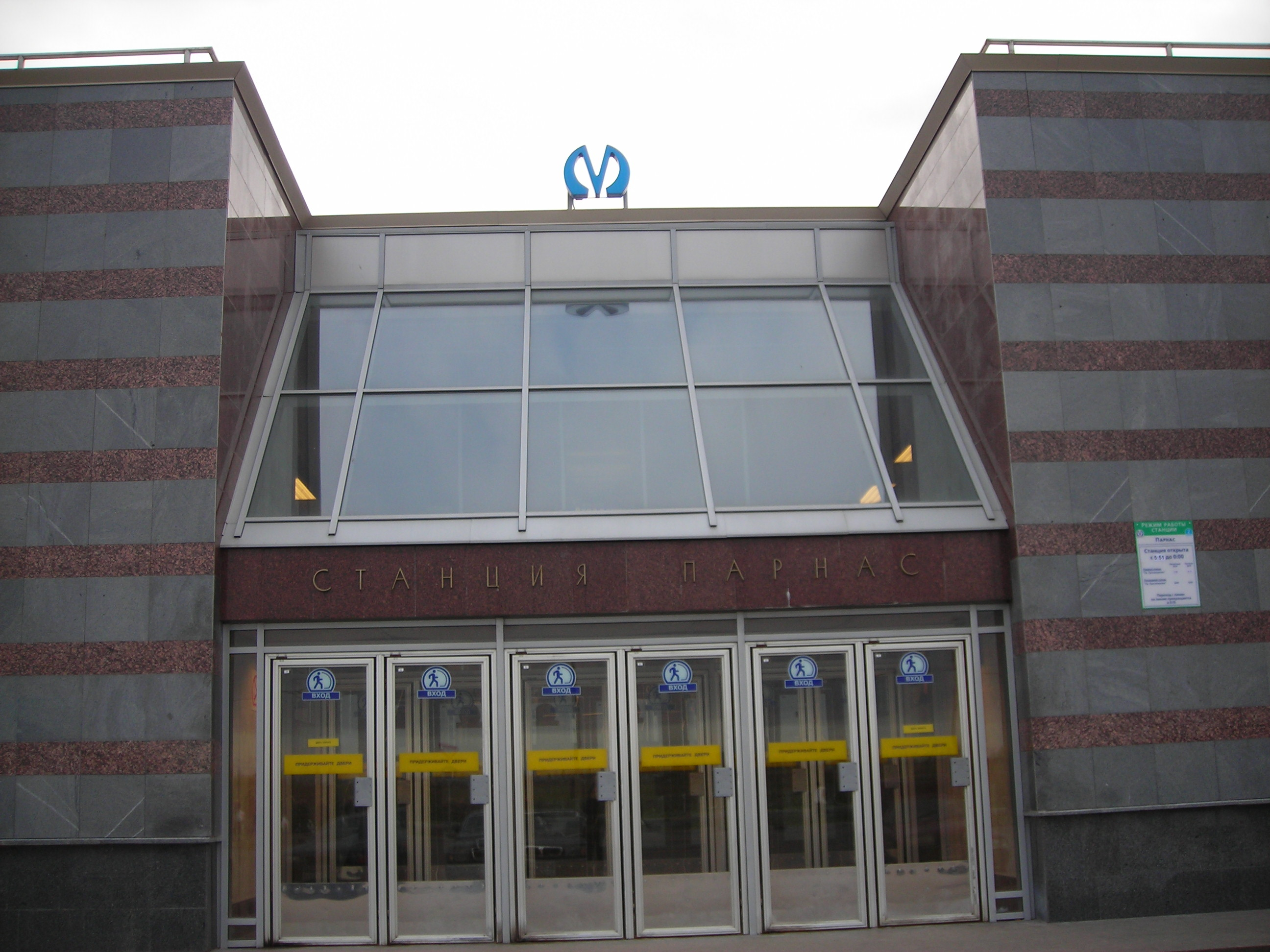
Entrance
