= Kupchino (Saint Petersburg Metro) =

Saint Petersburg Metro Station

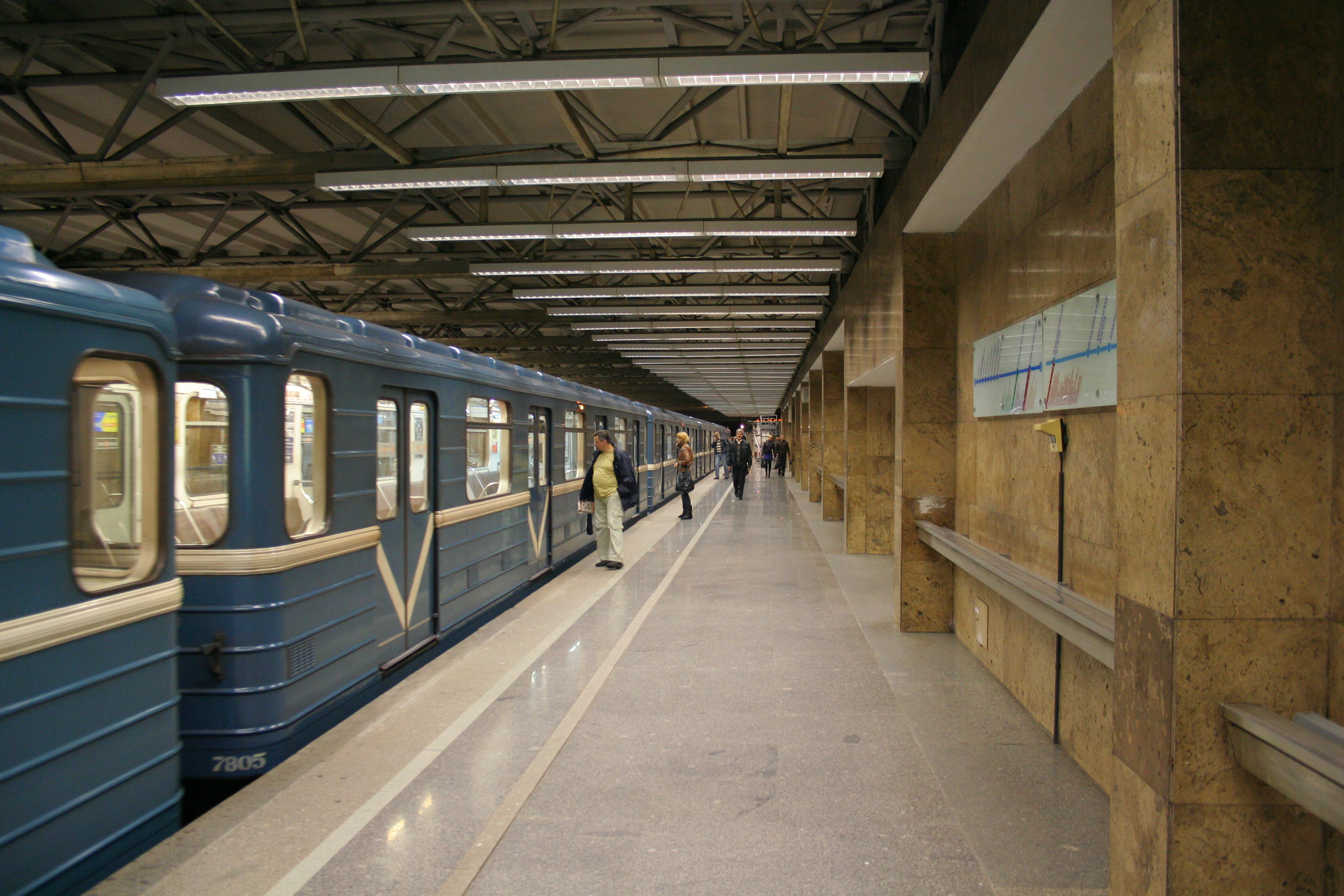
- Station Platform

General information
- Location: 108, Vitebskiy prospect, Moskovsky District; Saint Petersburg; Russia
- Coordinates: 59°49′47″N 30°22′31″E
- System: Saint Petersburg Metro station
- Operator: Saint Petersburg Metro
- Line: Moskovsko–Petrogradskaya Line
- Platforms: 2 (Side platforms)
- Tracks: 2

Construction
- Structure type: Above ground
- Cycle facilities: Yes

History
- Opened: 25.12.1972
- Electrified: 825 V DC

Services
Preceding station	Saint Petersburg Metro	Following station
Zvyozdnaya towards Parnas	Line 2	Terminus
Location

Kupchino (Russian: Ку́пчино) is a station on the Moskovsko-Petrogradskaya Line of the Saint Petersburg Metro. It was opened on 25 December 1972. It was designed by K.N. Afonskya, A.C. Getskin and I.E. Sergeyeva. According to the original plans, the station was initially supposed to be called "Vitebskaya". The station received its final name after a small village Kupchino, that is located 2 km to the North of the station.

Kupchino is the oldest surviving above-ground station in Saint Peterburg (the since-demolished Dachnoye predates it by several years). It has a transfer link-up to Kupchino Station of the Vitebskya Railroad. It also has two exits to outside the station, as well as a long tunnel that leads to Vitebsky Prospect.

The most famous resident of Kupchino is arguably the third President and previous Prime Minister of Russia Dmitry Medvedev, who grew up in this area. Another famous resident of the neighborhood is the mathematician Grigori Perelman.
