= Yugo-Zapadny =

Yugo-Zapadny (masculine), Yugo-Zapadnaya (feminine), or Yugo-Zapadnoye (neuter), meaning "South-West" in Slavic languages, may refer to:

- South-Western Administrative Okrug (Yugo-Zapadny administrativny okrug), an administrative okrug of Moscow, Russia
- Yugo-Zapadnaya, a station of the Moscow Metro, Russia
- Yugo-Zapadnaya, a station of the Saint Petersburg Metro, Russia

== See also ==
- Southwest (disambiguation)
- Yugo-Zapad Municipal Okrug, a municipal okrug of Saint Petersburg, Russia
