= Southwest (disambiguation) =

Southwest is a compass point.

Southwest, south-west, south west, southwestern or south-western or south western may also refer to:

- Southwest (direction), an intercardinal direction

== Geography ==
- South West Queensland, Australia
- South West (Western Australia), one of the nine regions of Western Australia
- Southwest National Park – a national park in Tasmania
- Southwest Region (Cameroon)
- Southwest China
- South West Africa, a region controlled by Germany, and later, South Africa. Now the independent country of Namibia.
- South-West Region, Ireland, a NUTS Level III region of Ireland and is governed by the South-West Regional Authority
- South-Western Administrative Okrug, an administrative division of the federal city of Moscow, Russia
- South West District, Singapore
- Southwest District (Penang)
- South West England, a region including the counties of Gloucestershire, Wiltshire, Dorset, Somerset, Devon and Cornwall
  - South West England (European Parliament constituency)
- South West (London sub region), a subregion of the London Plan
  - South West (London Assembly constituency), a constituency represented in the London Assembly
  - SW postcode area, for south-west London, England
- Southwestern United States
- Southwest, Indiana, an unincorporated community in the United States
- Southwest Township, Warren County, Pennsylvania, United States
- Southwest (Washington, D.C.), United States
- South West (Nigeria)
- South West State of Somalia, one of the six federal regions of Somalia
- South West Ethiopia Peoples' Region, one of the eleven regional states in Ethiopia
- Southwest Asia, an alternative name for West Asia region

== Transport ==
- South West Trains, a former UK train operating company
- Southwest Airlines, the largest U.S. domestic airline, founded in 1967
- South Western Railway (train operating company), a current UK train operating company
- South Western Railway (disambiguation), various railway lines and companies

=== Former airlines ===
- Air Southwest (Canada), a Canadian airline operating from 1983 to 2005
- China Southwest Airlines, merged into Air China in 2002
- Japan Transocean Air, an airline known as Southwest Air Lines (南西航空, Nansei Kōkū) from 1967 to 1993
- Pacific Southwest Airlines, founded in 1949 and merged into USAir in 1988
- Southwest Airways, a defunct post-World War II domestic United States regional airline
- Air Southwest, a British airline operating from 2003 to 2010

=== Former railroad routes ===
- A Chicago-Los Angeles train operated by Amtrak, and now known as the Southwest Chief
- Southwest Limited (Milwaukee Road train) formerly operated by the Chicago, Milwaukee, St. Paul and Pacific Railroad ("the Milwaukee Road") between Chicago/Milwaukee and Kansas City
- Southwestern Limited (IC train), an Illinois Central train, from Meridian, Mississippi to Shreveport, Louisiana, discontinued in 1967
- Southwestern Limited (New York Central train), a New York Central train, from New York, New York to St. Louis, Missouri, operating from 1889 to 1966

== Sports ==
- Southwestern Athletic Conference, a mid-major college athletic conference in the southern United States
- Southwestern Conference (Ohio), a high school athletic conference
- Southwest Conference, a former NCAA college athletic conference
- Gatlin Brothers-Southwest Golf Classic, a former PGA Tour golf event
- Southwest Region (Little League World Series), a youth baseball competition in the United States, and the largest in the world
- South Western F.C., a 19th century association football team from Govan, Scotland

== Other uses ==
- Southwestern Company, an American book publisher
- South-Western Educational Publishing, an American book publisher, now part of Cengage
- SouthWest Energy, an Ethiopian energy company
- Southwest (album), a collaboration album by Daz Dillinger and Nuwine
- Southwest (film), a 2012 Brazilian film

== See also ==
- South West Island (disambiguation)
- Southwest, Western Australia, a list of governmental divisions in Western Australia
- Southwest Corridor (disambiguation)
- Southwest University (disambiguation)
- Southwestern University (disambiguation)
- Southwest Region School District (SWRSD), a school district headquartered in Dillingham, Alaska
- Sud-Ouest (disambiguation), French for southwest
- Sud-Vest (development region), a region in Romania
- Yugo-Zapad Municipal Okrug, a municipal okrug in Krasnoselsky District of Saint Petersburg
