= Southwest Middle School =

Southwest Middle School can refer to one of the following schools:

- Southwest Middle School (Palm Bay, Florida), a public school in Palm Bay, Florida
- Southwest Middle School (Gastonia, North Carolina), a public school in Gastonia, North Carolina
- Southwest Middle School (Little Rock), a public school in Little Rock, Arkansas
- Southwest Middle School (Reading, Pennsylvania), a public school in Reading Pennsylvania
- Southwest Middle School (South Dakota), a public school in Rapid City, South Dakota

"Southwest" is also found in the name of other schools:

- Southwest College
- Southwest College of Political Science and Law
- Southwest High School (disambiguation)
- Southwest University (disambiguation)
