= SWC =

SWC may refer to:

== Arts and entertainment ==
- Star Wars Celebration
- Star Wars Combine, an online game
- Strangers with Candy, television series

== Organizations ==
=== Education ===
- Sir Winston Churchill School (disambiguation)
- Sisseton Wahpeton College
- Southwestern College (disambiguation)

=== Military organizations ===
- Space Warfare Center of the United States military
- Republic of Korea Army Special Warfare Command

=== Other organizations ===
- Simon Wiesenthal Center
- Stillwater Mining Company, which trades on the New York Stock Exchange under symbol SWC

== Sport ==
- South West Conference, a southern Connecticut high/prep school athletic conference
- Southwest Conference, a defunct American college athletic conference
- Southwestern Conference (Ohio), a high/prep school athletic conference in suburban Cleveland, Ohio
- Speedway World Cup, a motorcycle speedway championship event

== Technology ==
- Adobe SWC file, archive file for Adobe Flex components
- Semiwadcutter, a common shape of ammunition
- Single Wire Controller–area network
- Solar Wind Composition Experiment
- Steering Wheel Controls (often referring to audio controls)

== Transportation ==
- The Southwest Chief, a daily passenger train operated by Amtrak between Chicago, Illinois and Los Angeles, California.
- Stawell Airport, IATA airport code "SWC"

== Other uses ==
- Sarah Wayne Callies, American actress
- Storage World Conference
- Siemens Westinghouse Competition
