= Orehovaya mountain =

Orekhovaya Hill
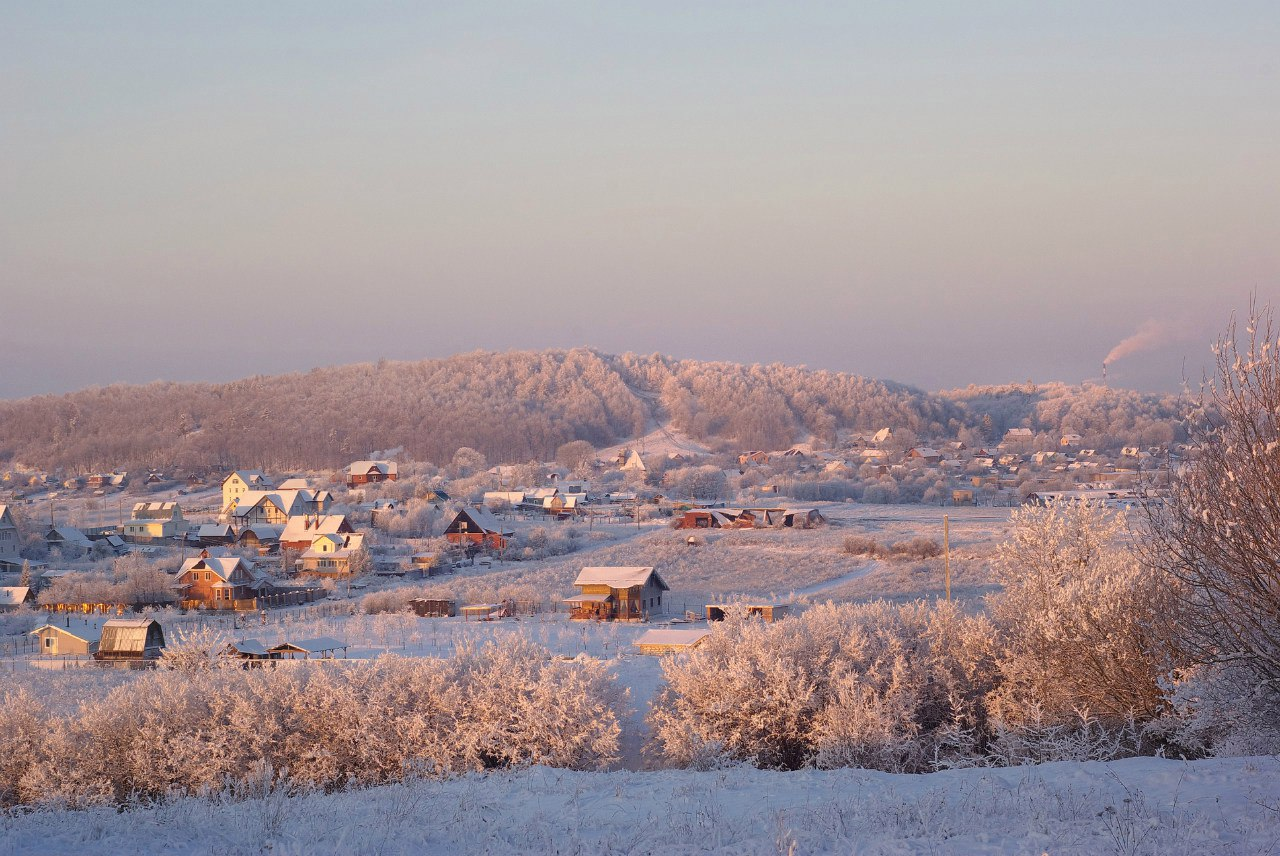
- Orekhovaya Hill in winter, viewed from Kirchhoff Hill

Highest point
- Elevation: 175.9 m (577 ft)
- Coordinates: 59.6973°N 30.1326°E

Geography
- Location: Krasnoselsky District, Saint Petersburg, Russia
- Parent range: Duderhof Heights

Orekhovaya Hill (Russian: Ореховая Гора) is a glacial hill in the Krasnoselsky District of Saint Petersburg, Russia. At 175.9 metres (577 ft) above sea level, it is the highest point in Saint Petersburg and one of the highest points in the southwestern part of Leningrad Oblast.

Together with Voronya Hill and Kirchhoff Hill, Orekhovaya Hill forms the Duderhof Heights, an elevated area situated near the upper edge of the Baltic-Ladoga Klint. The heights are bounded by glacially eroded valleys. In the 18th century, Voronya Hill and Orekhovaya Hill were not distinguished from one another and were regarded as a single hill known as Duderhof Hill.

The hill is located in the southwestern part of Saint Petersburg, approximately 12 km from the Saint Petersburg Ring Road. The Duderhof railway platform is situated nearby.

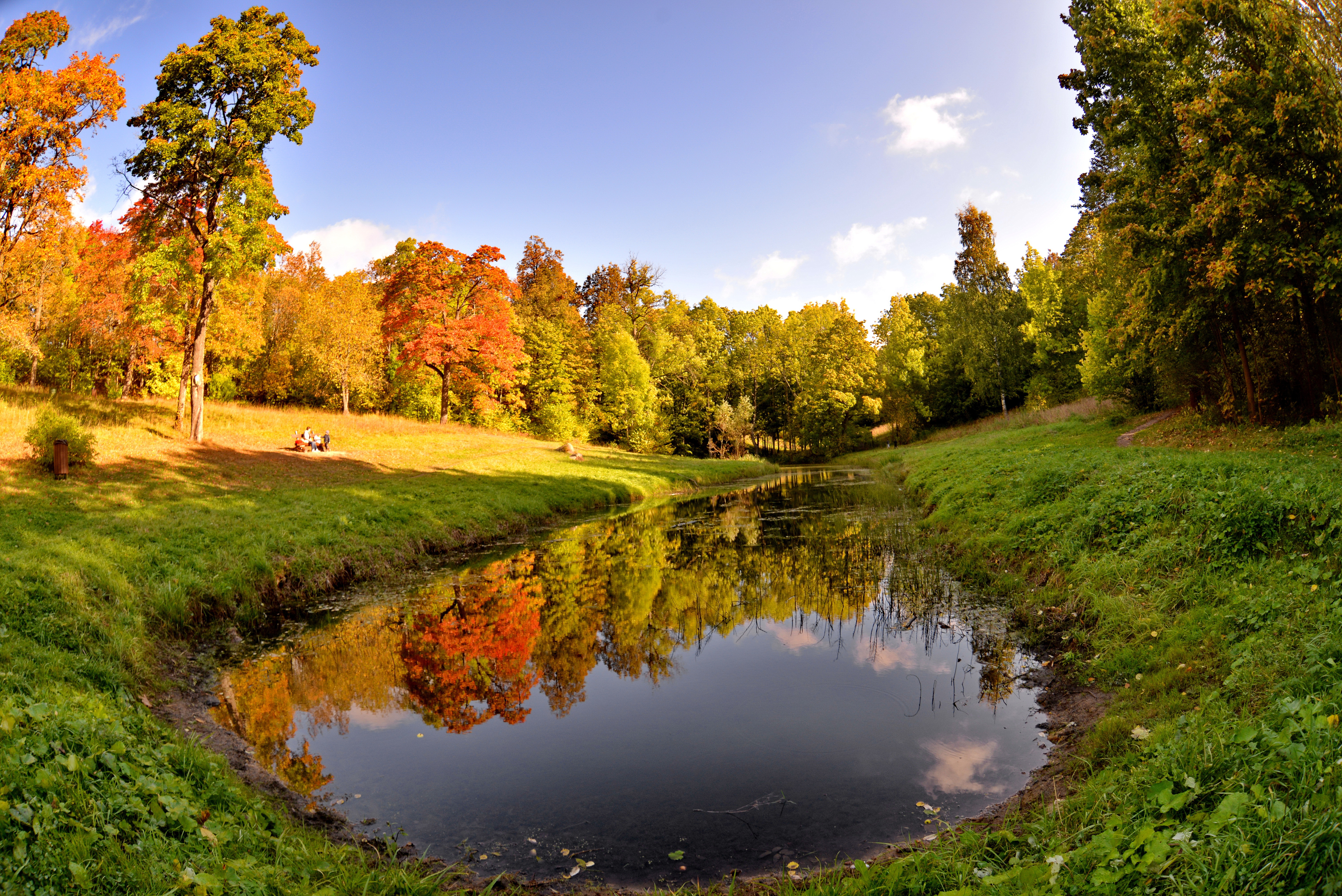
A lake in the valley between the hills of the Duderhof Heights
