= St. Margarets Bay, Nova Scotia =

Bay on the Atlantic coast of Nova Scotia, Canada

Coordinates: 44°35′N 64°00′W

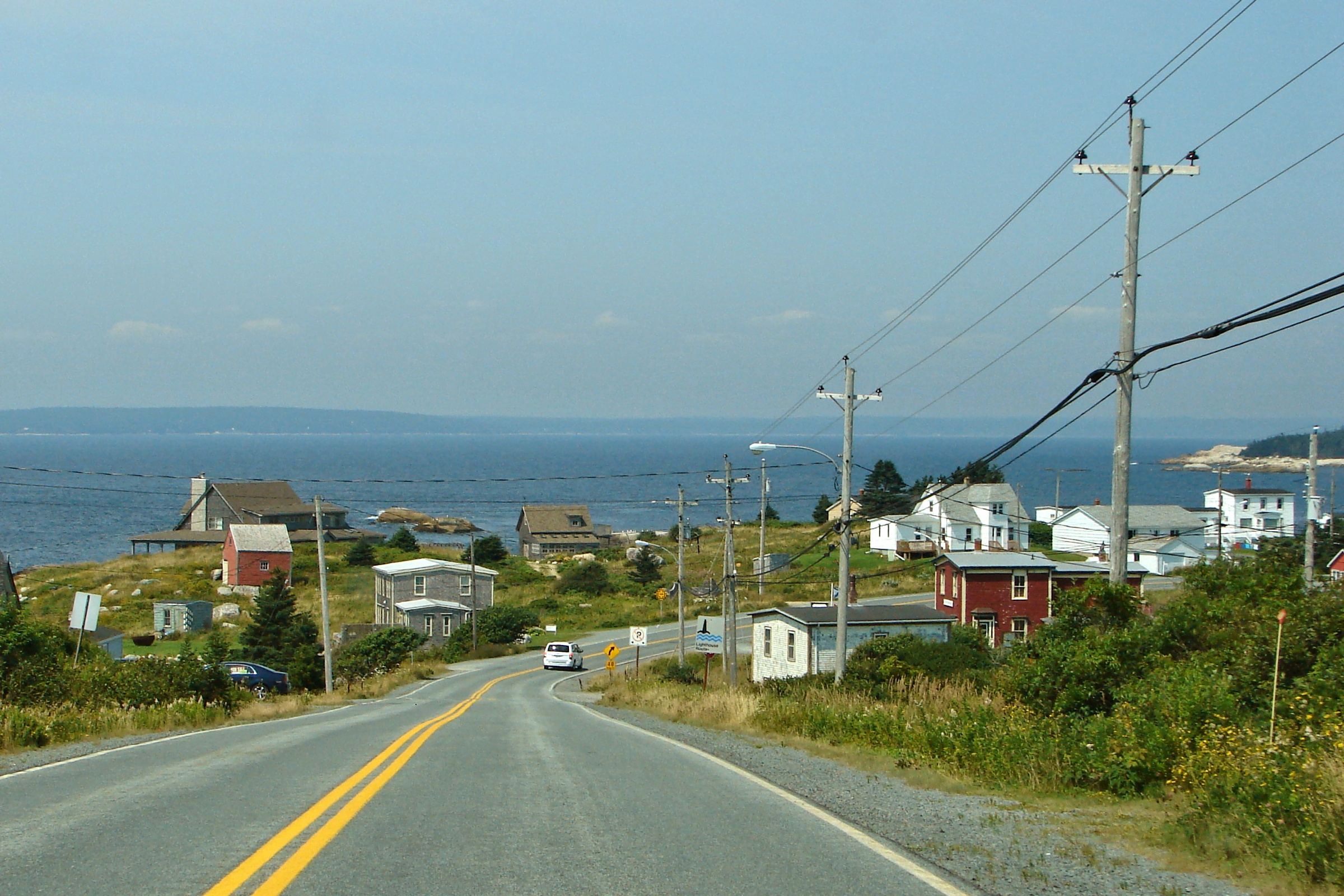
St. Margarets Bay as seen from Indian Harbour

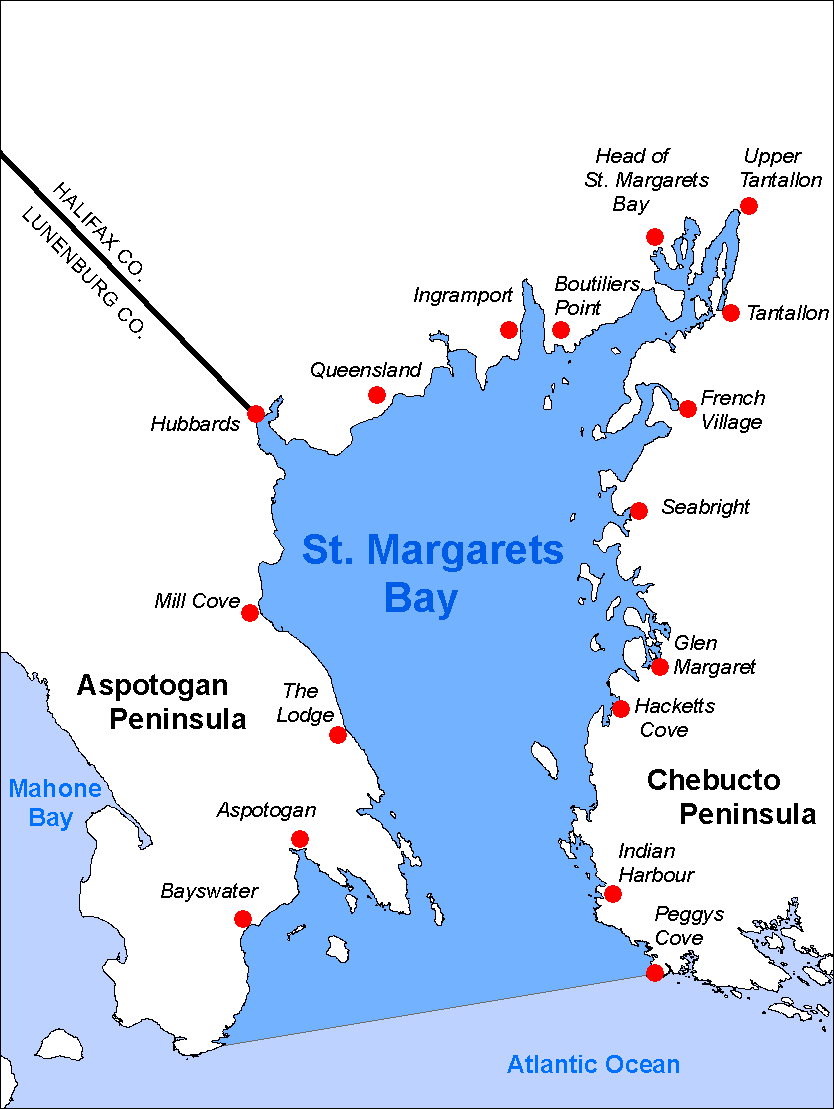
Map of St. Margarets Bay

St. Margarets Bay is a bay located on the Atlantic coast of Nova Scotia, Canada on the border of Halifax County (Halifax Regional Municipality) and Lunenburg County (Municipality of the District of Chester).

== Description ==
Opening south directly onto the Atlantic, the bay's eastern shore is formed by the Chebucto Peninsula and its western shore by the Aspotogan Peninsula, while the head of the bay (the northern shore) is the main part of the Nova Scotia peninsula.

The bay's shoreline is mostly rocky, although the head of the bay offers several sandy beaches at Queensland, Black Point and Cleveland; another sandy beach exists on the western shore of the bay at Bayswater and there is a small sandy beach along the eastern shore on Micou's Island. St. Margarets Bay is a cruising destination for sailing yachts as its picturesque shorelines offer protection in many natural harbours, as well as anchorages in coves and near small islands. The Bay was also a major fishery location during the mid-19th century.

== Communities ==
=== Eastern Shore ===
Along the Chebucto Peninsula (from south to north):

- Peggys Cove
- Indian Harbour
- Hacketts Cove
- Glen Margaret
- Seabright
- French Village
- Glen Haven
- Tantallon
- Whynacht's Point
- Upper Tantallon

=== Northern Shore ===
Along the head of the bay (from east to west):

- Allen Heights
- Todd's Island
- Head of St. Margarets Bay
- Mason's Point
- Boutilier's Point
- Ingramport
- Black Point
- Queensland
- Hubbards

=== Western Shore ===
Along the Aspotogan Peninsula (from north to south):

- Fox Point
- Mill Cove
- Birchy Head
- The Lodge
- Northwest Cove
- Southwest Cove
- Aspotogan
- Bayswater

== Islands ==
St. Margarets Bay contains numerous islands, particularly along its eastern shore. These islands were historically used by the Mi'kmaq Nation and some contain burial sites.

The bay's larger islands are listed below:

- Southwest Island
- Horse Island
- Shut-in Island
- Croucher Island
- Owls Head Island (connected to the mainland by a small bridge)
- Moser's Island
- Micou's Island

== Swissair 111 ==
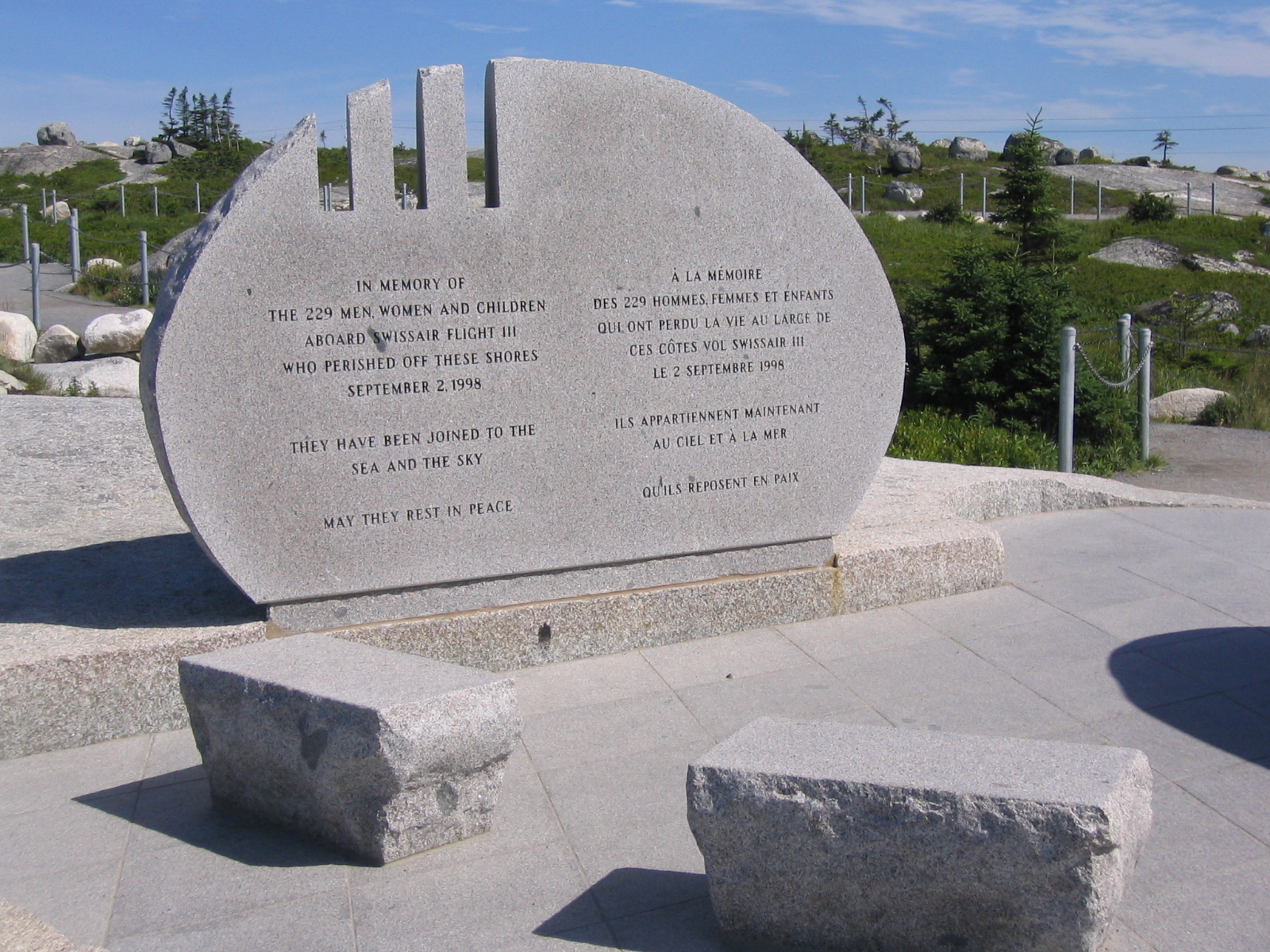
Swissair 111 Memorial, Peggys Cove, Nova Scotia

The Swissair Flight 111 Memorial is located at The Whalesback, a promontory approximately 1 km northwest of Peggys Cove. It is one of two memorials built to commemorate the victims of the Swissair Flight 111 disaster, which crashed into St. Margarets Bay on 2 September 1998. The crash site is roughly equidistant between the Whalesback Memorial and another memorial at Bayswater, Nova Scotia, located on the Aspotogan Peninsula on the western shore of the bay, opposite Peggys Cove.

The monument reads in English and French: "In memory of the 229 men, women and children aboard Swissair Flight 111 who perished off these shores September 2nd, 1998. They have been joined to the sea, and the sky. May they rest in peace."

The site of the crash and the two monuments form a triangle. The three notches on the monument at Whalesback represent the numerals 111. The sight line from the three grooves in the stone points to the crash site, while the markings on the facing stone point to the memorial at Bayswater. The memorial wall at Bayswater lists the names of the passengers and crew. The facing stone points to the crash site.

== War Plan Red ==
In the period between World War I and World War II, the US military drew up a series of Colour Coded War Plans based on likely global threats. War Plan Red denoted a planned attack against the British Empire and by extension War Plan Crimson which called for an invasion of Canada. The plan involved an attack on many fronts starting with a seaborne invasion of Halifax and Canada's Maritime provinces via St. Margarets Bay.
