= Southwestern Community College =

The name Southwestern Community College is shared by several campuses in several states in the United States:

- Southwestern College in Chula Vista, California
- Southwestern Community College (North Carolina), Sylva, North Carolina
- Southwestern Community College (Iowa), Creston, Iowa, with extension campuses in Osceola and Red Oak

== See also ==
- Southwest University (disambiguation)
- Southwest College, a community college in Houston, Texas
- Southwestern University (disambiguation)
- Southwestern College (disambiguation)
- Southwestern Community College (disambiguation)
