= Southwest Territory (disambiguation) =

Southwest Territory or variant, may refer to:

== West of the Appalachians, south of the Ohio, east of the Mississippi ==
- Territory South of the River Ohio (aka Territory of the South-West), territory that became the state of Tennessee, USA
  - Southwest Territory's at-large congressional district

== North American southwest ==
- Old Southwest of the American frontier in the USA
- Southwestern United States, what became of the frontier after the Old West era in the USA
- Archaic Southwest, the pre-Columbian North American southwest

== Other uses ==
- Southwest Territory (Six Flags Great America), Gurnee, Illinois, USA; a themepark attraction
- South West Africa, (South African non-governing territory of the South West), now Namibia
- Southwestern Krai or Southwestern Land in the historical Russian Empire

== See also ==
- Southwest (disambiguation)
