= Indian Harbour, Nova Scotia =

Small fishing community in the Canadian province of Nova Scotia

Coordinates: 44°31′35.1″N 63°56′23.8″W

Indian Harbour in Nova Scotia

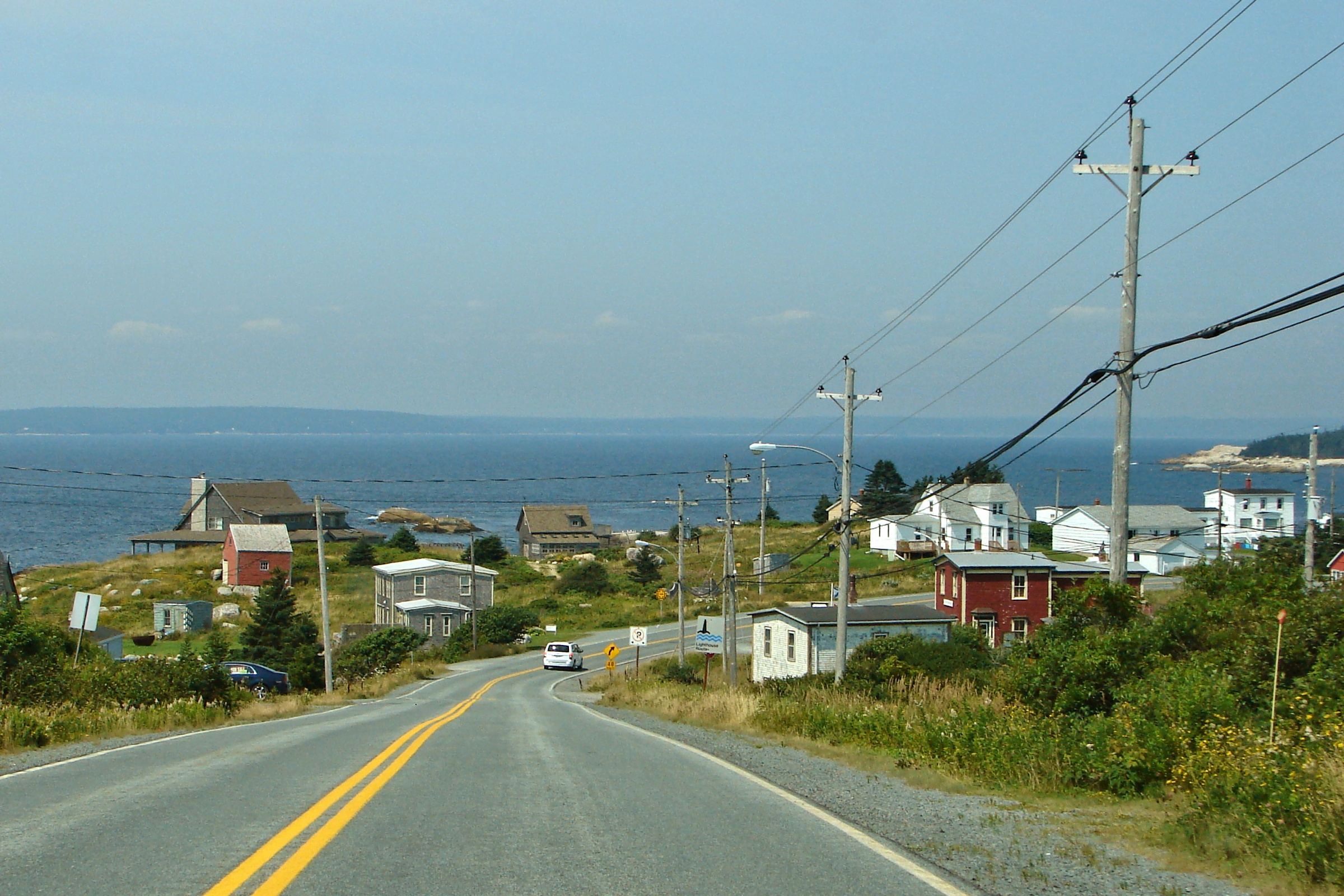
Indian Harbour

Indian Harbour is a small fishing community of the Halifax Regional Municipality in the Canadian province of Nova Scotia on the Chebucto Peninsula. It is located between the communities of Peggy's Cove and Hacketts Cove.

== History ==
Indian Harbour was founded in the early 18th century. The first recorded person to live in Indian Harbour was John Ormsby in 1784. The first and the oldest house in Indian Harbour is still standing today at the age of over 250 years.

Indian Harbour is located next to the popular tourist destination Peggy's Cove and its famous lighthouse. There is also a lighthouse in Indian Harbour, located at the end of Paddy's Head Peninsula. The lighthouse was built in 1901 and staffed until 1945, when power was introduced to the area.

Indian Harbour's roads were dirt and had to be up kept by the locals until 1955 when Route 333 was widened and paved.

In recent years one of Canada's biggest air disasters took place over the Atlantic Ocean near St. Margarets Bay. On September 2, 1998, Swissair Flight 111 crashed just off the coast; all 229 people on board died. Today in the memory of all 229 crew and passengers there is a memorial in the community just before entering the Peggy's Cove area.

Nova Scotian singer Anne Murray use to own a beach in Indian Harbour, on the Paddy's Head Peninsula, she allowed the public to use the beach, but the property was sold in 1999.

== Schools ==
Indian Harbour has had three schools in its history. The first school was built in 1878 and is said to have burnt down; it was located on the Government Wharf Road, 50 yards from the Baptist church. In 1891 the second school was built where East St. Margaret's Elementary currently stands. This school served the communities of Hacketts Cove, Indian Harbour and Peggy's Cove. On November 18, 1958, East St Margaret's Elementary School opened its doors. The school served grades primary to twelve; in 1966 the grades were reduced to primary to eight; when Tantallon Junior High opened in 1972, the grades were reduced to primary to six. Today East St. Margaret's is still serving Indian Harbour. The school has room for 198 students.

== Swissair Flight 111 ==
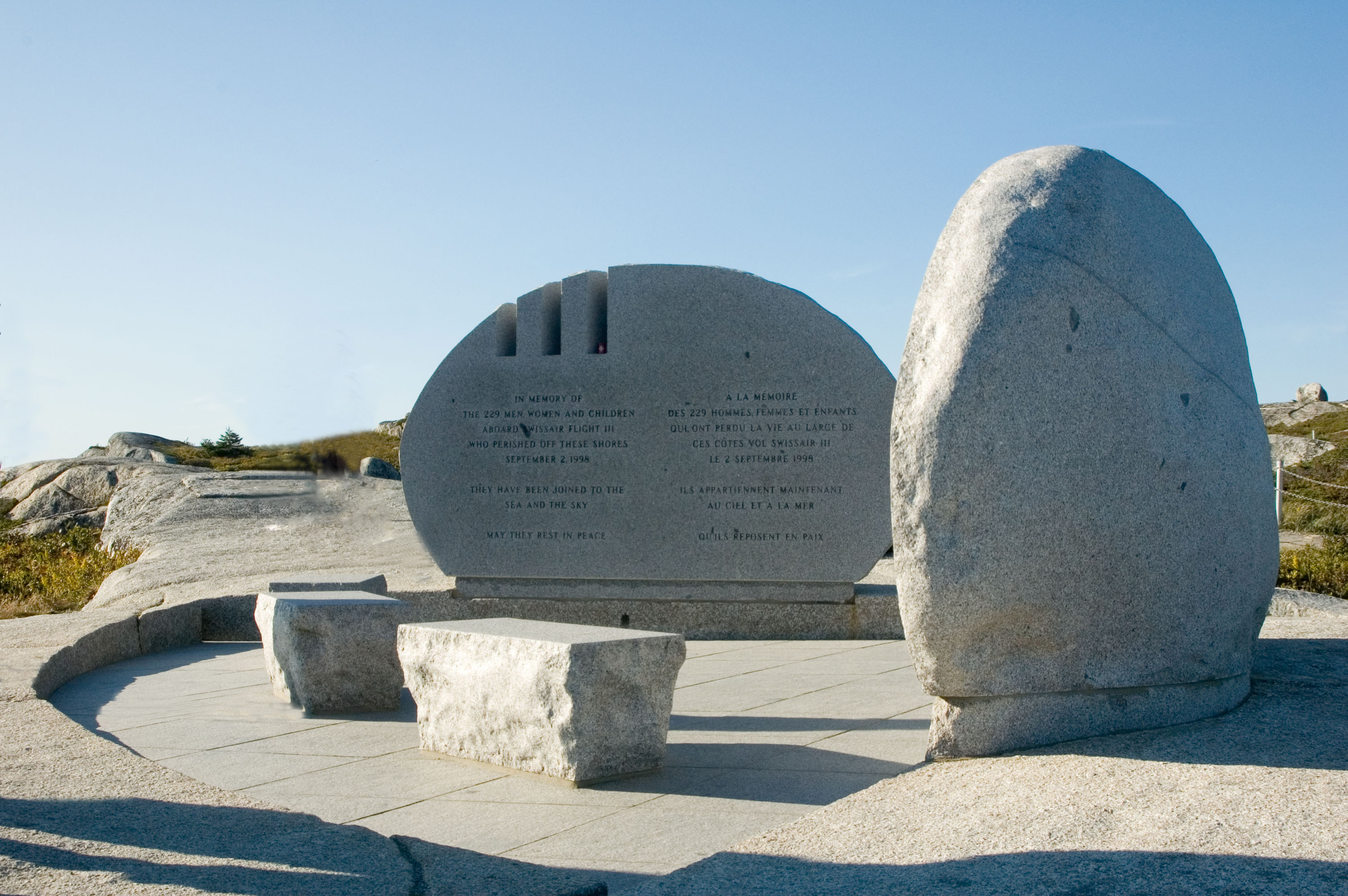
Swissair 111 Memorial near Peggy's Cove

On September 2, 1998, Swissair Flight 111 crashed into St. Margaret's Bay with the loss of all 229 aboard. One of two memorials to the victims of the disaster is located at The Whalesback, in Indian Harbour. The other is located at Bayswater, Nova Scotia, on the Aspotogan Peninsula on the western shore of the bay. The two monuments and the actual crash site are at the vertices of a roughly equilateral triangle across the bay.

The monument at Whalesback reads in English and French: "In memory of the 229 men, women and children aboard Swissair Flight 111 who perished off these shores September 2nd, 1998. They have been joined to the sea, and the sky. May they rest in peace."

The three notches represent the numerals 111. The sight line from the three grooves in the stone points to the crash site, while the markings on the facing stone point to the memorial at Bayswater. The memorial wall at Bayswater contains the names of the 229 passengers and crew of Flight 111. The facing stone points to the crash site.

== Transit ==
Currently there are no buses running from Halifax to Indian Harbour; the closest bus route is in Tantallon where the "MetroX" and Metro Transit run busses from Tantallon to Halifax.

== Television ==
Indian Harbour gets all of the local television from Halifax. The following television stations air in St. Margarets Bay:

- CBC Nova Scotia (CBHT-DT)
- CTV Maritimes (CJCH-DT)
- Global Maritimes (CHIF-DT)

== Local business ==
Local businesses include Rhubarb Restaurant, Make and Break Cafe, YardArm Restaurant, the King Neptune Campground, the Oceanstone Inn and Cottages, and the Clifty Cove Motel. Indian Harbour only has one store, the Whale's Back; locals call it "the store". The Whale's Back serves people from West Dover to Glen Haven and tourists in the summer; it has the same owners as the Sou' Wester Restaurant & Giftshop in Peggy's Cove.
