= Duderhof Heights =

Protected area in Saint Petersburg, Russia

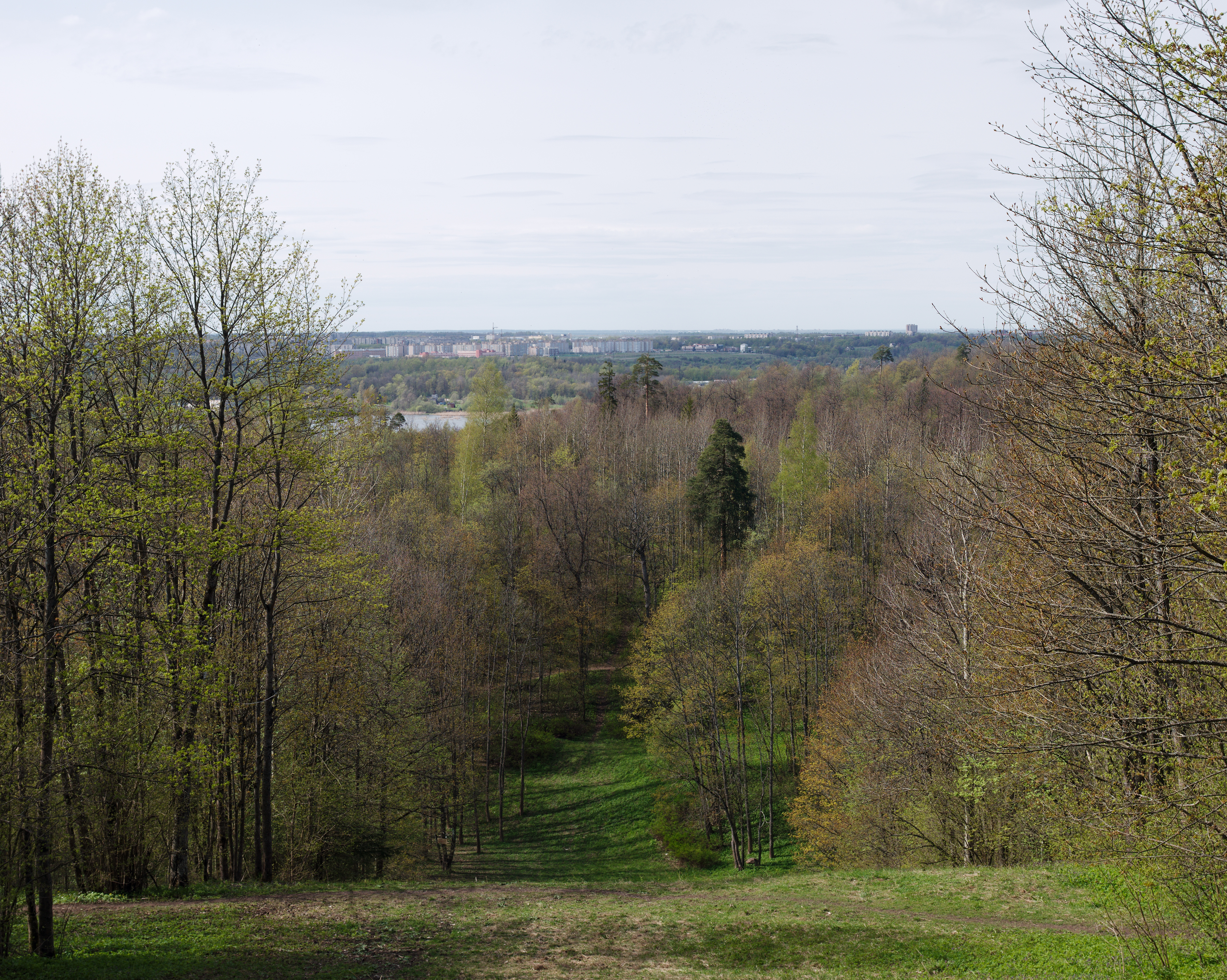
Panoramic view of Duderhof Heights

Duderhof Heights or Duderhof Hills (Russian: Дудергофские высоты; German: Duderhofer Höhen) is a small highland area in the southwestern part of Saint Petersburg (Krasnoselsky District).

The nearest railway station, Mozhayskaya (formerly Duderhof) of the Ligovo-Krasnoye Selo-Gatchina railroad (constructed in 1859), is situated immediately to the west of the hills.

== Geography ==
The heights are located to the south of the town of Krasnoye Selo, on the northern edge of the Izhora Plateau, which consists of several hills, most notably, the Orekhovaya hill (Russian: Ореховая гора, lit. Hazel Hill, 59°41′51″N 30°07′55″E), the highest point of Saint Petersburg at 176 m (577'), in the south, and the Voronya hill (Russian: Воронья гора, lit. Crow Hill, 59°42′09″N 30°07′38″E), 147 m (482'), in the north. Sometimes other smaller hills are considered part of the area as well: the Lysaya hill (Russian: Лысая гора, lit. Bald Hill) further northward, the Kirchhof hill (Russian: гора Кирхгоф) to the east, and the Kavelakhtinskaya ridge (Russian: Кавелахтинская гряда) further to the south (however, all the smaller hills are situated in Leningrad Oblast rather than in Saint Petersburg).

== Flora ==
Since 1992 the Orekhovaya and Voronya hills have been designated as protected area (of about 66 hectares (160 acres)), divided by Sovetskaya Street of the settlement Dudergof into two parts. Nowadays both hills are mostly covered by broadleaf forests (with Acer platanoides, Fraxinus excelsior, Tilia cordata, Ulmus glabra, Quercus robur, Corylus avellana), very uncommon for the region situated in the taiga belt, and have a peculiar fauna and flora. The steep slopes of the hills and alkaline soils on the limestone bedrock are also notable. For a critically endangered species of weevil, Otiorhynchus rugosus Humm., this is the only known location in European Russia. This is also one of the few sites in Saint Petersburg and Leningrad Oblast where European beech is able to overwinter in cultivation, albeit suffering considerable dieback.

The vegetation on the hills hasn't remained intact and has been subject to heavy anthropogenic influence for the last two centuries. In the first half of the 19th century a landscape garden was laid down on the Orekhovaya hill. During the Siege of Leningrad (1941-1944) the battlefront ran through the hills and they became almost completely deforestated. German artillery positions shelling the city were situated on the Voronya hill. The hills are still a popular ski resort. The surrounding area is totally devoid of forests and mostly built up.

== See also ==
- Pulkovskiye Heights
- Highest points of Russian Federal subjects
