= Owls Head, Nova Scotia =

Owls Head, Nova Scotia may refer to:

- Owls Head, Halifax, Nova Scotia
- Owls Head, Lunenburg County, Nova Scotia
