= Southwest Corridor =

Southwest Corridor or the Southwest Expressway can refer to:

- Southwest Corridor (Boston), a cancelled highway near Boston, Massachusetts
- Metro Green Line Extension (Minnesota), also known as the Southwest LRT, a future light rail project in Minneapolis, Minnesota
- The Southwest Corridor Plan, a transit project in Portland, Oregon
- Southwest Corridor (St. Louis MetroLink), a proposed light rail line in St. Louis
- Stevenson Expressway, formerly the Southwest Expressway in Chicago and its southwest suburbs

== See also ==
- Southwest (disambiguation)
- Southwest Freeway (disambiguation)
