= Ligovsky Pond =

Former pond in St. Petersburg

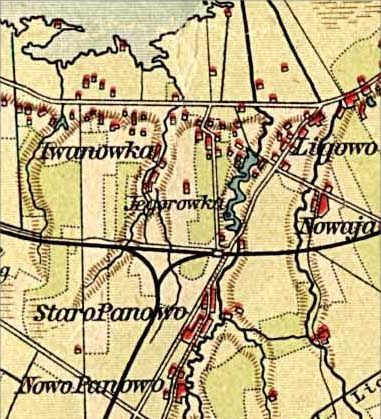
- German map of 20th century

- Location within Saint Petersburg
- Location: Ligovo, suburb of Saint Petersburg
- Coordinates: 59°49′24″N 30°11′03″E
- Lake type: Artificial, former
- Primary inflows: Dudergofka river
- Primary outflows: Dudergofka river
- Basin countries: Russia
- Max. length: 1.7 km (1.1 mi)
- Islands: Love island with grotto
- Settlements: Ligovo

Ligovsky Pond (Russian: Лиговский пруд) was an artificial lake that existed in Ligovo, suburb of Saint Petersburg (Russia) from 1716–1941.

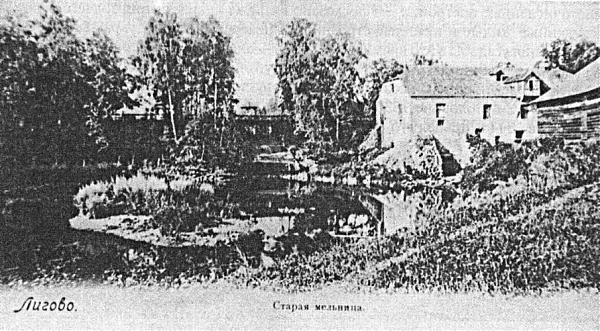
Ligovo watermill on a postcard from 1900

In 1703, Peter I was based the city of Saint Petersburg. This area became a capital suburb. In 1710s emperor gook part in the destiny of the settlement. It was enjoined to block the Dudergofka river in 1715. On a dam a watermill which specialised on flour-grinding and felting works was constructed.

Simultaneously the Ligovsky channel was built. It diverted an essential source of water from Dudergofka and its reservoir became a source of water for Ligovo. At that time the surrounding district represented imperial grange for palace maintenance with foodstuffs, including a dairy farm and gardens.

In 1765 Grigory Orlov became the owner of the district. On the western coast of a pond were the house with landing stage and economic activity. On the east coast the manour house where Orlov accepted Russian empress Catherine II was constructed.

After Orlov died in 1783, Ligovo was inherited by his pupil Natalia Alekseeva. She married Orlov's aide-de-camp Friedrich Wilhelm von Buxhoeveden. In the 1840s the manor of Buxhoeveden passed to count G. G. Kushelev-Bezbordko (younger), it continued useful agricultural activity, and Ligovo became an agricultural manor. A network of avenues and paths created specific hills and ponds were excavated. The house has a connected covered transition to kitchen. To the north were zones for an orchard with greenhouses, stables, the bird's and cattle courtyard. The lakeshore was improved by architect A. Stackenschneider. He added a terrace, a path from the house to lake, and a grotto on Love Island.

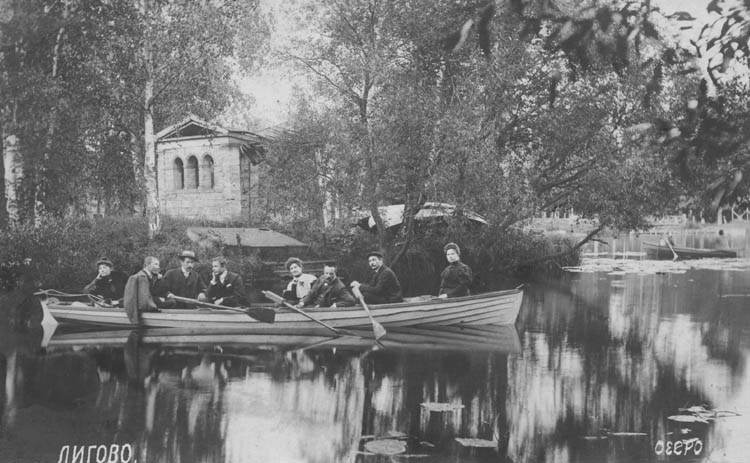
Love Island in 1900

After Kushelev-Bezbordko's death the manor gradually fell into decay. In 1857 the Baltic railway arrived. By the end of the 1870s vicinities Ligovsky pond became a holiday area.

During the October Revolution in 1917 the lake, a dam and a mill were supported. After that the mill stopped. Waterfalls fell from the dam.

The pond mirror was supported by a mill dam until 1941. On 5 December 1941 German armies destroyed the dam on the approach to Leningrad. After the Second World War hydraulic work was not restored. A ravine overgrown with bush became dominant. The former lake was not developed and became a memorial zone for the 700 men who died defending the area. Nearby an Orthodox church is under construction.
