= Nautel =

Radio transmitter manufacturer

Nautel Ltd.
- Type: Private
- Industry: Broadcasting
- Founded: 1969; 57 years ago
- Founder: Dennis Covill
- Headquarters: Hackett's Cove, Nova Scotia, Canada
- Products: AM and FM broadcast transmitters, navigational radio beacons, DGPS, NAVTEX transmitters, high frequency amplifiers
- Website: http://www.nautel.com/

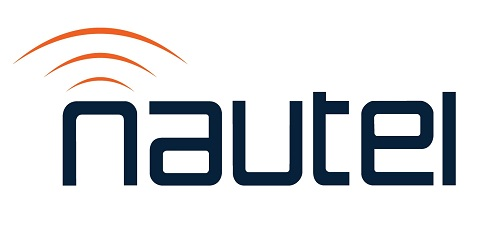
Nautel logo

Nautel Ltd. is a Canadian manufacturer of AM and FM radio broadcast transmitters, navigational radio beacons, Differential Global Positioning System (DGPS) transmitters, NOAA weather radio transmitters, LF PNT/eLORAN transmitters, SONAR high-power low-frequency amplifiers and SONAR systems, medium frequency (MF) telegraph and NAVTEX transmitters, and high frequency (HF) amplifiers for dielectric heating applications. Nautel was the first company to develop a commercially available, fully solid-state AM broadcast transmitter.

== History ==
Nautel was founded in 1969 in the rural community of Hackett's Cove, Nova Scotia. Its primary operation was building and supplying solid state navigation beacons for the Canadian government. In an effort to better serve the US market, Nautel Maine Inc., a wholly owned subsidiary located in Bangor, Maine, was founded in 1974. Nautel diversified into the sonar market with the acquisition of Marport C-Tech Ltd., a manufacturer of military and commercial sonar systems in Cornwall, Ontario, in 2013.

Nautel delivered its first transmitter, a radio beacon for the Canadian government, in 1970. This was a fully solid-state unit operating in the 190–535 kHz Aeronautical/Marine navigation band. These were the first transmitters made not of the tube variety (that were commercially available). Because of the greater reliability and longevity of solid state transmitters many of these early models are still in use today.

The introduction of 10 kW and 50 kW solid state AM transmitters from Nautel in 1982 and 1985 was another first for the broadcast industry. The first 50 kW AM transmitter from Nautel was purchased by CBA (AM) in Moncton where it remained operational until April 8, 2008, when the station's AM signal was taken off the air. Although commonplace today, solid state transmitter technology was non-existent before Nautel entered the market. More than 30 years after being introduced, many of Nautel's first generation of AM transmitters can still be found operational at transmitter sites around the world.

Nautel's introduction of solid state transmitter technology has had an impact on the radio broadcast industry. As the benefits of solid state technology became clear, the industry began to shift away from the use of tube transmitters and began to adopt the more reliable and efficient solid state designs. By the early 1990s, solid state transmitters were being widely used in radio broadcasting, while sales of vacuum tube transmitters began to decline. Since its inception in 1969, Nautel has focused solely on solid state broadcast technology with a lineup of 100% solid state radio transmitters at power levels ranging from 300 W to 2,000 kW. With the July 10, 2014 shutdown of Larcan, Nautel is the only Canadian manufacturer of broadcast transmitters.

Nautel's founder, Dennis Covill, was appointed as a Member of the Order of Canada on December 30, 2012.
