= Pulkovo Heights =

Hill chain near Saint Petersburg, Russia

Coordinates: 59.771811°N 30.326047°E

Pulkovo Heights (Russian: Пу́лковские высо́ты) is a chain of hills located to the south of Saint Petersburg. They run to the south-west in the direction of the Izhora Plateau and have an altitude of up to 73 meters.

In Neolithic times (about 7500–5000 years ago) Pulkovo heights were Littorina Sea coast. Its bottom is a modern Neva Lowland with stretching on her St. Petersburg. The ancient sea gradually retreated and took the place of the current Baltic Sea. Apparently, the place abounded with impassable forests and swamps. Thick forest covered the Pulkovo heights, but it was gradually cut down.

In the 18th century, located at the foot of Pulkovo village of Gallerovo, Tolmachevo, Pesky, Lower and Upper Koyerovo, Kamen, Kiskino, Glinyanaya Gora, a neighborhood on the site of Pulkovo – Pulkovo village, founded in 1714 at the Pulkovo Manor. A road ran from Pulkovo Koporye in Ladoga.

On 12 November 1917, during the October Revolution, Alexander Kerensky and Pyotr Krasnov, commanding 700 Cossacks of the 3rd Cavalry Corps, were forced to retreat to Gatchina Palace after being stopped at Pulkovo Heights by Red forces.

The hills were used as a natural defense line during the Russian Civil War and the siege of Leningrad, when the Germans occupied the hills from September 1941 to January 1944. It is the location of the Pulkovo Observatory and the industrial suburb of Shushary.

== See also ==
- Duderhof Heights
