= South West Island =

South West Island may refer to:

- South West Island (Northern Territory), Australia
- South West Island (Newfoundland and Labrador), Canada
- Moekawa / South West Island, New Zealand

== See also ==
- North East Island (disambiguation)
- North West Island
- South East Island
- South West Isle
- South West Penang Island
- South West Petrel Island
- Southwest Island
