= Glen Haven, Nova Scotia =

Glen Haven
- Rural Community
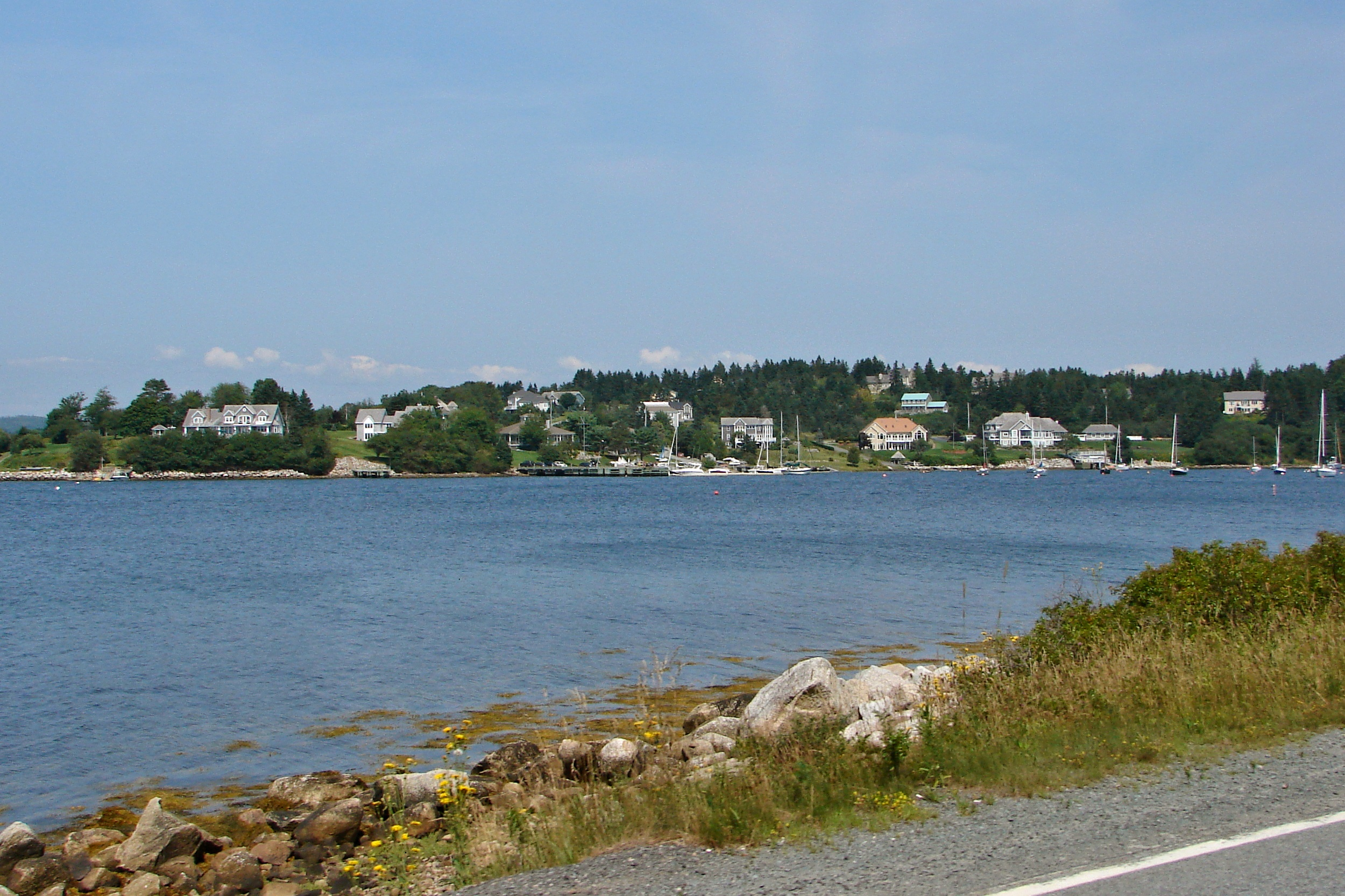

- Glen Haven in Nova Scotia
- Coordinates: 44°38′47″N 63°54′32″W
- Country: Canada
- Province: Nova Scotia
- Municipality: Halifax Regional Municipality
- Community council: North West Community Council
- District: 13: Hammonds Plains - St. Margarets
- Founded: 1785
- GNBC code: CANTL

Glen Haven (population 204) is a small coastal community within the Halifax Regional Municipality of Nova Scotia, Canada, about 40 km from Halifax city centre. It is situated on the shore of the St. Margarets Bay immediately adjacent to Tantallon and French Village along Route 333, also known as Peggy's Cove Road.

It was once a part of French Village and was settled around 1785 by a number of foreign Protestants from Lunenburg County. Around 1900, Gordon Hubley organized a petition to create a separate community with a new name - and its own post office. Family names of settlers including Boutilier, Hubley and Dauphinee can still be found in the bay area.

Within the community is a peninsula called Indian Point that stretches into the bay. At its tip are two small islands: Big Indian Island and Little Indian Island. All three are so named because of arrowheads that have been found there in the past, suggesting that this was once a Mi'kmaq summer camping ground. Big Indian Island is also popularly referred to as Micou's Island. It is a tidal island accessible by a sandbar at low tide which has become a popular beach during summer months.

== Notable events ==
The 2009 Nautel Laser Yacht World Championship was held at the St. Margaret Sailing Club.
