= Line 6 (Saint Petersburg Metro) =

Krasnoselsko-Kalininskaya

Overview
- Status: Operational
- Owner: Saint Petersburg Metro
- Locale: Saint Petersburg, Russia
- Termini: Yugo-Zapadnaya; Putilovskaya
- Stations: 2 (6 planned)

Service
- Type: Rapid transit
- System: Saint Petersburg Metro

History
- Opened: 26 December 2025; 10 months ago

Technical
- Track gauge: 1,524 mm (5 ft)

Krasnoselsko-Kalininskaya line (Russian: Красносе́льско-Кали́нинская линия), or simply line 6, is a passenger rapid transit line of the Saint Petersburg Metro system. It is identified by the livery colour of brown. The line is currently worked by two eight-car Baltiets trainsets supplied by Transmashholding. Train service began on 26 December 2025 with 2 stations (Yugo-Zapadnaya and Putilovskaya). Four more stations will be inaugurated later in 2029. The line lies from Krasnoselsky District, then travels northeastward, with interchange stations allowing passenger transfer with line 1, line 2 and line 5.

In the longer term of planning, the northeast end of line 6 would continue extending into Kalininsky District, including stations with transfers to the remaining line 3 and line 4.
