= Southwestern University (disambiguation) =

Southwestern University is in Georgetown, Texas, U.S.

Southwestern University may also refer to:

- Southwestern University (Philippines) in Cebu City, Philippines
- National Southwestern Associated University, China

== See also ==
- Southwest University (disambiguation)
- Southwest College, a community college in Houston, Texas
- Southwestern College (disambiguation)
- Southwestern Community College (disambiguation)
- Southwestern Law School, Los Angeles
