= Southwestern College =

Southwestern College may refer to the following colleges in the United States:

- Southwestern College (California)
- Southwestern College (Kansas)
- Southwestern College (New Mexico)
- Southwestern College of Business and New England Technical Institute, now part of Lincoln Tech
- Arizona Christian University, formerly Southwestern College

== See also ==
- Southwest University (disambiguation)
- Southwestern University (disambiguation)
- Southwestern Community College (disambiguation)
- The College at Southwestern, now L.R. Scarborough College
- Rhodes College, Memphis, Tennessee, formerly Southwestern at Memphis
- Southwest College, Houston, Texas
- Southwestern Assemblies of God University, in Waxahachie, Texas
- Southwestern Christian College, in Terrell, Texas
- South West College, Northern Ireland
- University of Texas Southwestern Medical Center at Dallas
