= Ligovo railway station =

Railway station in Saint Petersburg, Russia

Ligovo
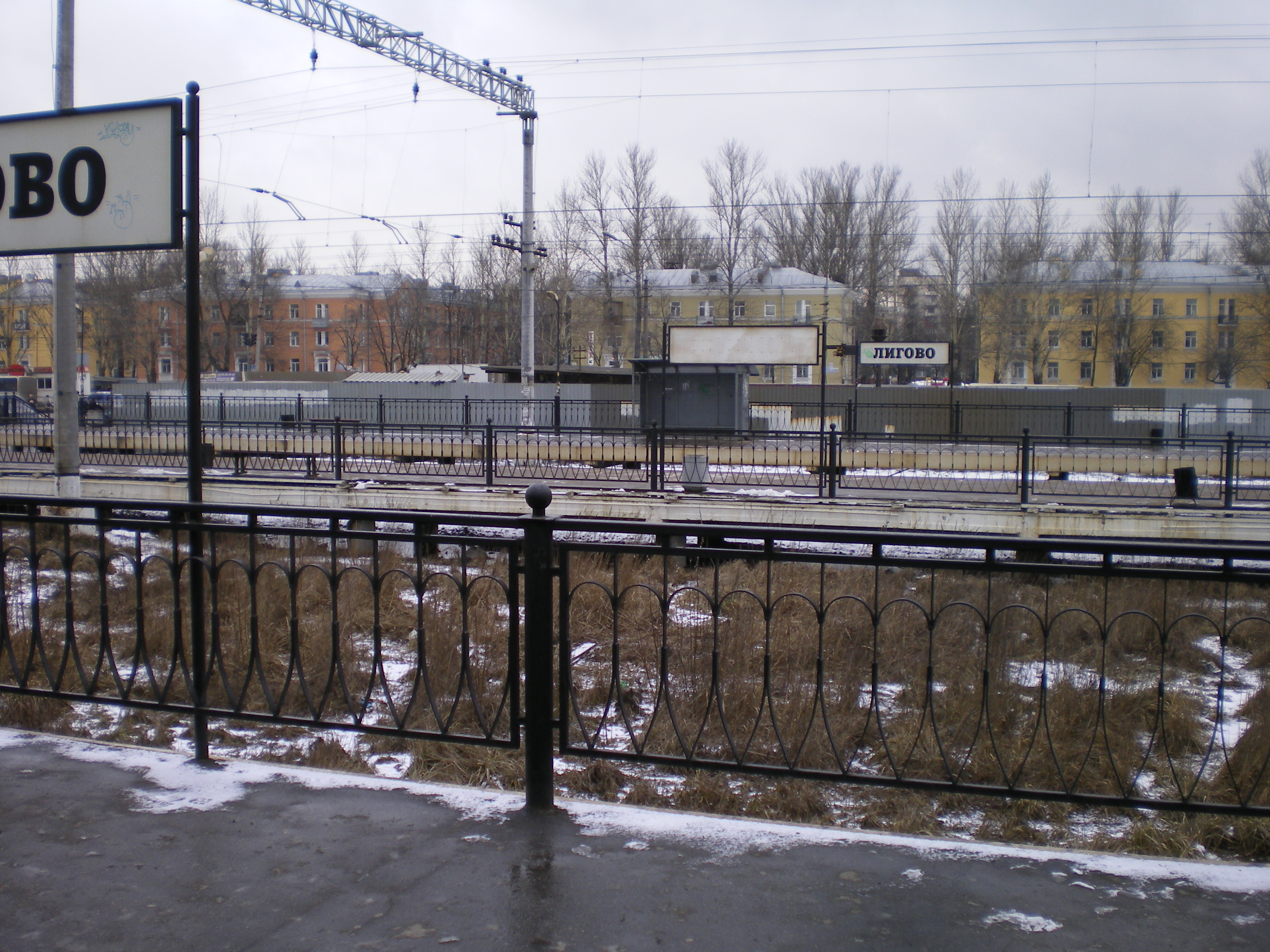
- 3 platforms of Ligovo and urban development of 1960s

General information
- Location: 54, Narodnogo Opolchenya street
- Coordinates: 59°49′24″N 30°10′44″E
- System: Commuter service passenger station
- Line: Saint Petersburg Baltiisky – Kalische
- Platforms: 4
- Tracks: 5
- Connections: Saint Petersburg Baltiisky – Krasnoflotsk Saint Petersburg Baltiisky – Baltiisky rail terminal (Gatchina)

Other information
- Station code: 034505
- Fare zone: 2

History
- Opened: 1857
Location

Ligovo railway station (Russian: Ста́нция Ли́гово; Finnish: Liiha) is a railway station located in St. Petersburg, Russia.

== History ==
In the 1950s Ligovo has fallen into decay, last fact was process of dissociation of land plots as a result of reforms of 1861. At this time through Ligovo there has passed Baltic Railway which has connected the Baltiysky Rail Terminal in St. Petersburg with Petergof. The first trains have gone on the way to 1857.

The architecture of a building of station corresponded to the junction status on a line conducting to imperial residences. The first wooden building of station with a high tower has existed prior to the beginning of 20th century. It was replaced by a brick structure: on the second platform the canopy for the passengers, corresponding to a direction to Gatchina has been arranged. Structures have existed till the end of 1941.

In 1941–1945 of the USSR and Germany participated in Second World War. Ligovo has entered into territory on which took place fights for Leningrad (Siege of Leningrad operation). Since December 1941 till January 1944 on settlement territory there passed a front line. All buildings and constructions have been destroyed, at deviation the German armies have put out of commission bridges and railways tracks; besides, the set of objects has been mined. From station Dachnoye to station Ligovo sappers have taken and have neutralised minefields in density of 1,500 pieces on road kilometre.

== Images ==
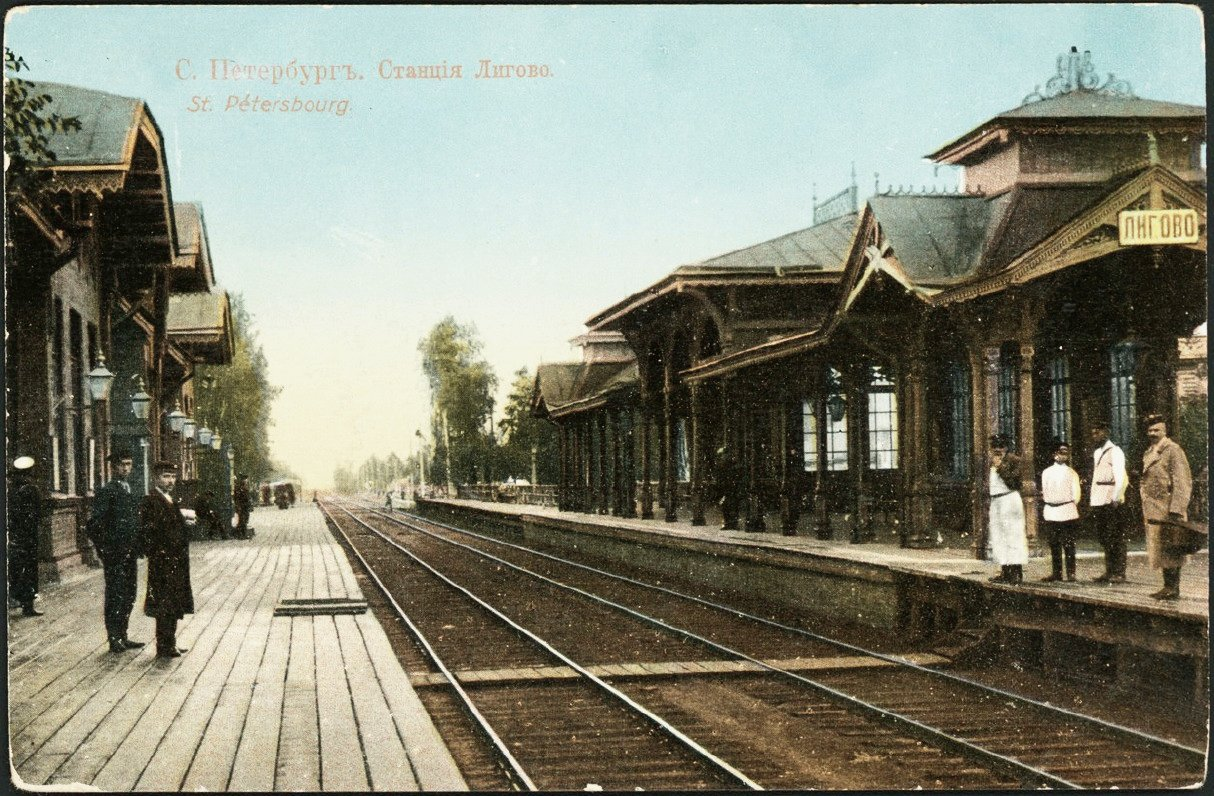
Brick structures of station of the beginning of 20th century

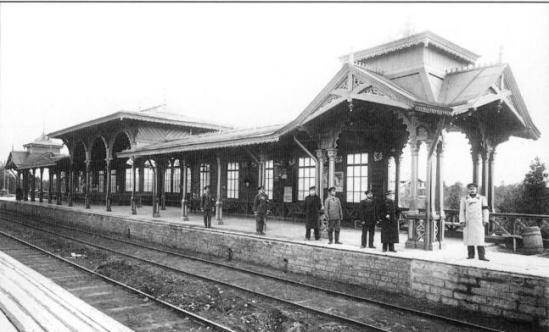
Glazed canopy of a platform
