= Sud-Ouest =

Sud-Ouest (French for southwest) may refer to:

== Places ==
- Sud-Ouest Region (Burkina Faso), the Burkina Faso region
- Sud-Ouest Region (Cameroon), the Cameroon region
- Ile du Sud-Ouest, an isle in the Cosmoledo atoll
- Le Sud-Ouest, a borough in Montreal, Quebec
- Province du Sud-Ouest, the Southwest Province in Cameroon
- Rivière du Sud-Ouest, rivers in Quebec

== Companies ==
- Sud Ouest (newspaper), a newspaper
- CIT du Sud-Ouest (CITSO), a bus company
- SNCASO (Société nationale des constructions aéronautiques du sud-ouest), a French former aircraft manufacturer

== See also ==
- Southwest (disambiguation)
- South West France (disambiguation)
