= Krasnoselsky District, Saint Petersburg =

Krasnoselsky District Красносельский район (Russian)
- District
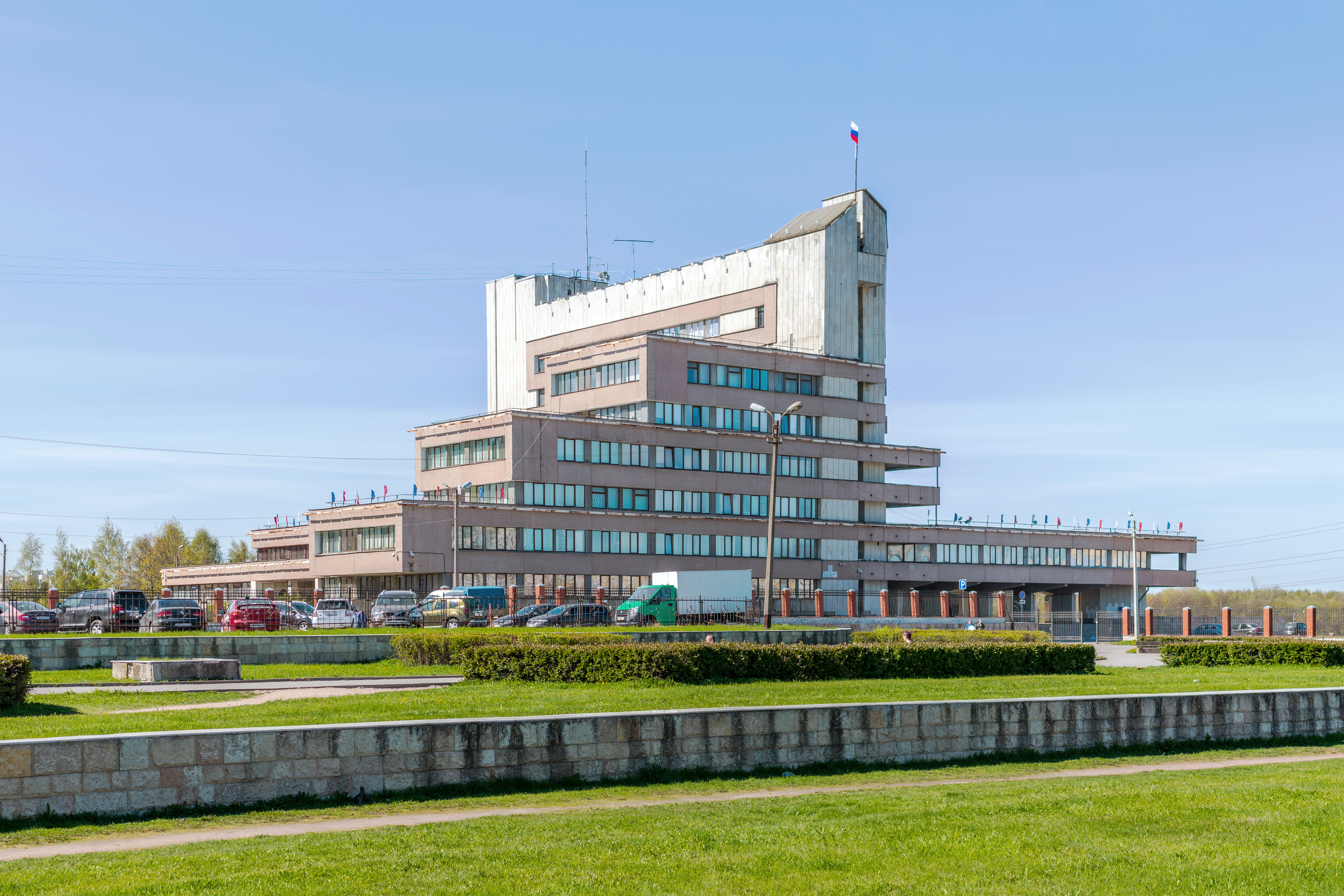
- Krasnoselsky District Administration building
- Krasnoselsky District on the 2006 map of St. Petersburg
- Coordinates: 59°50′N 30°08′E
- Country: Russia
- Federal subject: federal city of St. Petersburg
- Established: April 13, 1973
- Administrative center: Krasnoye Selo

Population (2010 Census)
  - Total: 330,546
- Website: http://gov.spb.ru/gov/terr/reg_krasnoselsk/

Krasnoselsky District (Russian: Красносе́льский райо́н) is a district of the federal city of St. Petersburg, Russia. As of the 2021 Census, its population was 426,372; up from 330,546 recorded in the 2010 Census.

== History ==
The district was established by the decree of the Presidium of the Supreme Soviet of Russia on April 13, 1973. In addition to Krasnoye Selo, the district was given part of the territory of Kirovsky District (from Ugolnaya Gavan to Tallinn Highway, the villages of Ligovo (historical district) Uritsk, Sosnovaya Polyana (district) Sosnovaya Polyana, Sergievo (historical district) Sergievo, Staro-Panovo), as well as Gorelovo (district) Gorelovo, Toriki, and Mozhaysky (historical district) Mozhaysky.

In 1979, the settlement of Khvoyny (Krasnoye Selo), previously part of the Gatchina District of the Leningrad Region, was incorporated into the Krasnoselsky District. The territory of this military town is surrounded on all sides by the territory of the Gatchina District of the Leningrad Region; it is an enclave. In 2003, two apartment buildings, which had previously been part of the village of Villozi, numbered 10 and 16 (now Gatchinskoye Shosse, 60, buildings 1 and 2, respectively), became part of the Krasnoselsky District.

== Municipal divisions ==
Krasnoselsky District comprises the municipal town of Krasnoye Selo, 7 intracity municipalities and the following six municipal okrugs:

- Gorelovo
- Konstantinovskoye
- Sosnovaya Polyana
- Ligovo
- Yugo-Zapad
- Yuzhno-Primorsky

This is the only district of St. Petersburg that includes both municipal districts within the city limits and the city itself. However, the district administration is not located in Krasnoe Selo but in the municipal district of Uritsk.

Between February 2019 and December 2024, Oleg Fadeenko headed the Krasnoselsky District Administration. In December 2024, Fadeenko was accused of corruption and removed from office.

== Transportation ==
=== Metro ===
Until 2025, Krasnoselsky District was the last city district without a metro — the exits of the nearest metro stations, "Prospekt Veteranov 1" and "Prospekt Veteranov 2," are located in the Kirovsky District. For this reason, this station is the busiest station in Russia and the former Soviet Union in terms of passenger traffic. Passenger traffic at the stations reaches 83,800 people per day (2017 data). Residents of the district can also take commuter trains to the Baltiysky railway station.

In 2015, a tender was held for the construction of the Yugo-Zapadnaya metro station as part of the Krasnoselsko-Kalininskaya line. The tender was won by the Metrostroy company. According to the state contract, the station was to be built and commissioned no earlier than 2024. According to mayor Beglov, the metro plans for 2025 were as follows: complete the section from Yugo-Zapadnaya to Putilovskaya with a transfer hub to Kirovsky Zavod station. On 26 December 2025, the Yugo-Zapadnaya station was put into operation, becoming the first metro station in the district. As of 2026, city authorities and the metro administration are already developing further continuation of the Line 6.

== Gallery ==
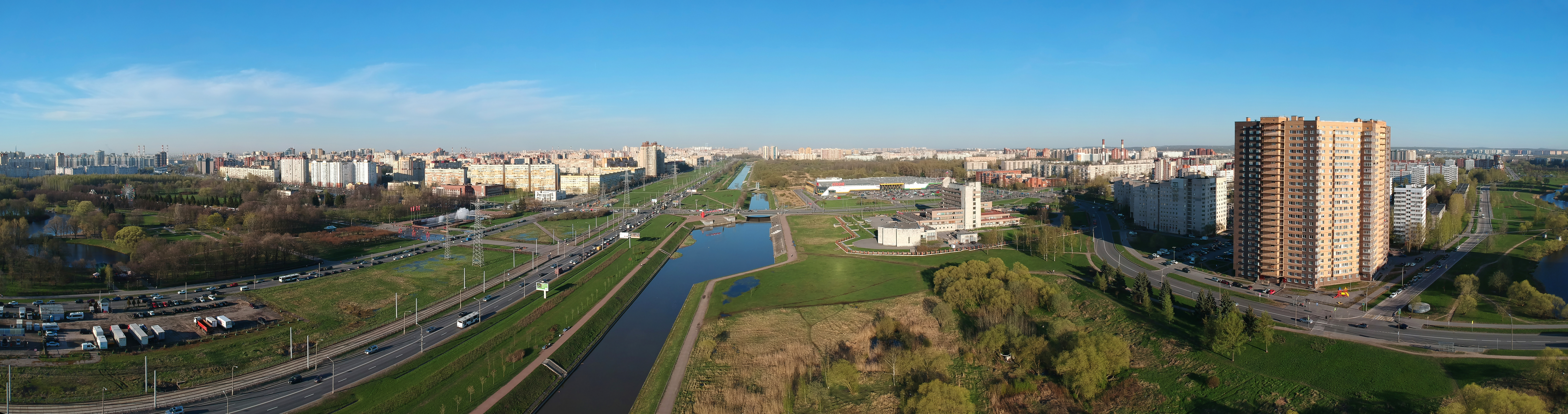
Panorama of the Krasnoselsky District.
