= Micou's Island, Nova Scotia =

Tidal island in Glen Haven, Nova Scotia

Coordinates: 44°37′58″N 63°56′19.6″W

Micou's Island
Native name: Unknown
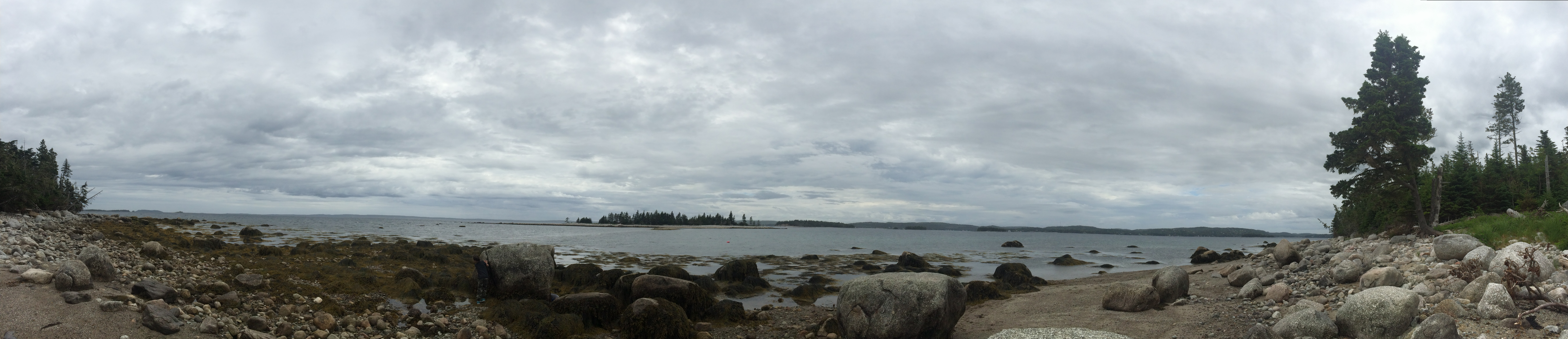
- View of Little Indian Island from Micou's Beach
- Interactive map of Micou's Island

Geography
- Location: Glen Haven

Administration
- Canada

Micou's Island is a 22-acre (89,000 m^{2}) tidal island located in the Glen Haven community near the eastern shore of St. Margarets Bay, Nova Scotia, Canada. The island is accessible by a sandbar at low tide and has become a popular beach during summer months.

== Mi'kmaq ==
The island is also known as Big Indian Island, named together with Little Indian Island (a smaller tidal island next to Micou's) and Indian Point peninsula because of arrowheads that have been found there in the past, suggesting that this was once a Mi'kmaq summer camping ground. Their presence, and history, on Micou's can be observed through two shell middens that can be found there. These seemingly insignificant piles of shells are actually ancient refuse piles, left over from centuries of the seasonal harvest of shellfish in the area. The piles have endured the stand of time as those who deposited them would have used them as indicators to mark the spots that were good for harvest. With the help of the Nova Scotia Museum of Natural History, there is confirmation of two Mi’kmaq burial sites in the area.

== European Settlement – Post 1700s-1930s ==
The area was first settled by James Dauphinee in 1785, with the original family farmhouse still located on Indian Point. The Family used Micou's Island for cattle and sheep farming. Plus they would harvest wood and hay every summer from the island.

== The Micou Family – 1930 - 2005 ==
Micou's Island got its name in the 1930s when the island was sold to an American family, the Micous. The Micous used the island as a summer vacation spot.

== Island Stewardship ==
In 2007 the island was bought by the province and is now being cared for jointly by Nova Scotia Department of Natural Resources and the St. Margaret's Bay Stewardship Association. The Department of Natural Resources has stated it intends to manage the island for recreational purposes in an ecologically sensitive manner. An area is a popular place for hikers and a favourite beach destination during the warm summer months.

== Features of the Island ==
=== Micou Family Memorial ===
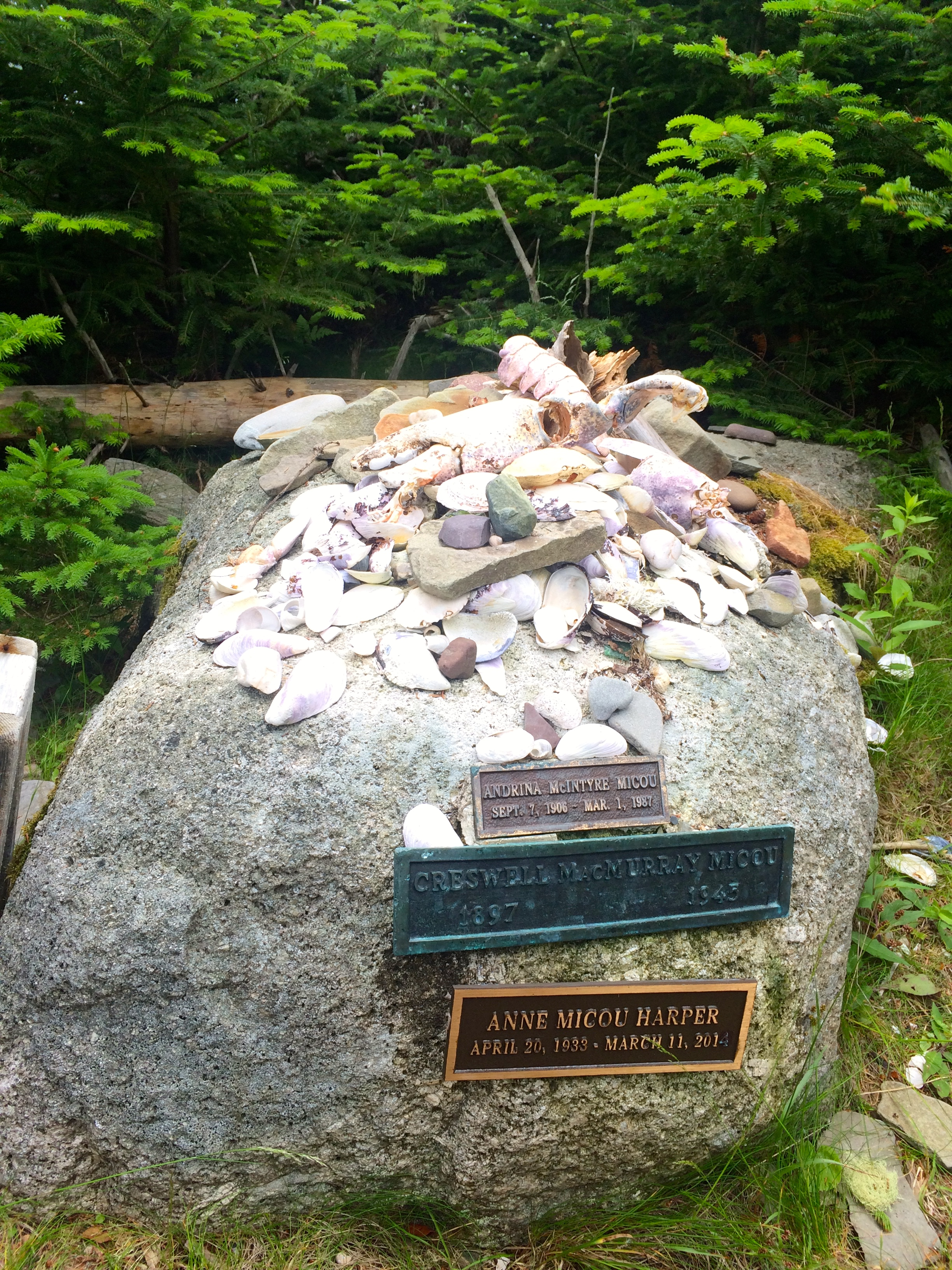
A memorial site for Micou family

On the far side of the island is a memorial site for Creswell MacMurrary Micou and his wife Andrina McIntyre. In 2014 Anne Micou Harper memorial plaque was added to the memorial rock. The Ashes of the residents have been spread here during memorial services. Many hikers leave shells and their beach finds at the memorial site, in memory of the island residents.

=== Strong Arm ===
The oldest living tree on Micou's Island – a sugar maple known as "Strong Arm". It is estimated to be over 185 years old and one of only two sugar maples on the entire Island, Strong Arm is the spiritual centre of the island for many reasons and generations have sought its broad canopy for solace and meditation. In 2021, the central stem of the maple tree has fallen.

=== Sand Bar ===
The sandbar that connects Micou's Island to the mainland of the Indian Pt. peninsula is walkable (without getting wet) for a 5-hour window that is 2.5 hours on either side of low tide.
