= Owls Head, Lunenburg County, Nova Scotia =

Inhabited island in St. Margarets Bay, Nova Scotia, Canada

Coordinates: 44°31′17.5″N 64°0′18.1″W

Owls Head in Nova Scotia

Owls Head is a Canadian inhabited island in St. Margarets Bay, Nova Scotia. Connected to the mainland by a small bridge, it forms part of the community of Southwest Cove.
