= Northwest Cove, Nova Scotia =

Cove on the St. Margarets Bay, Nova Scotia, Canada and the community surrounding it

Coordinates: 44°32′6.67″N 64°1′20.32″W

Northwest Cove in Nova Scotia

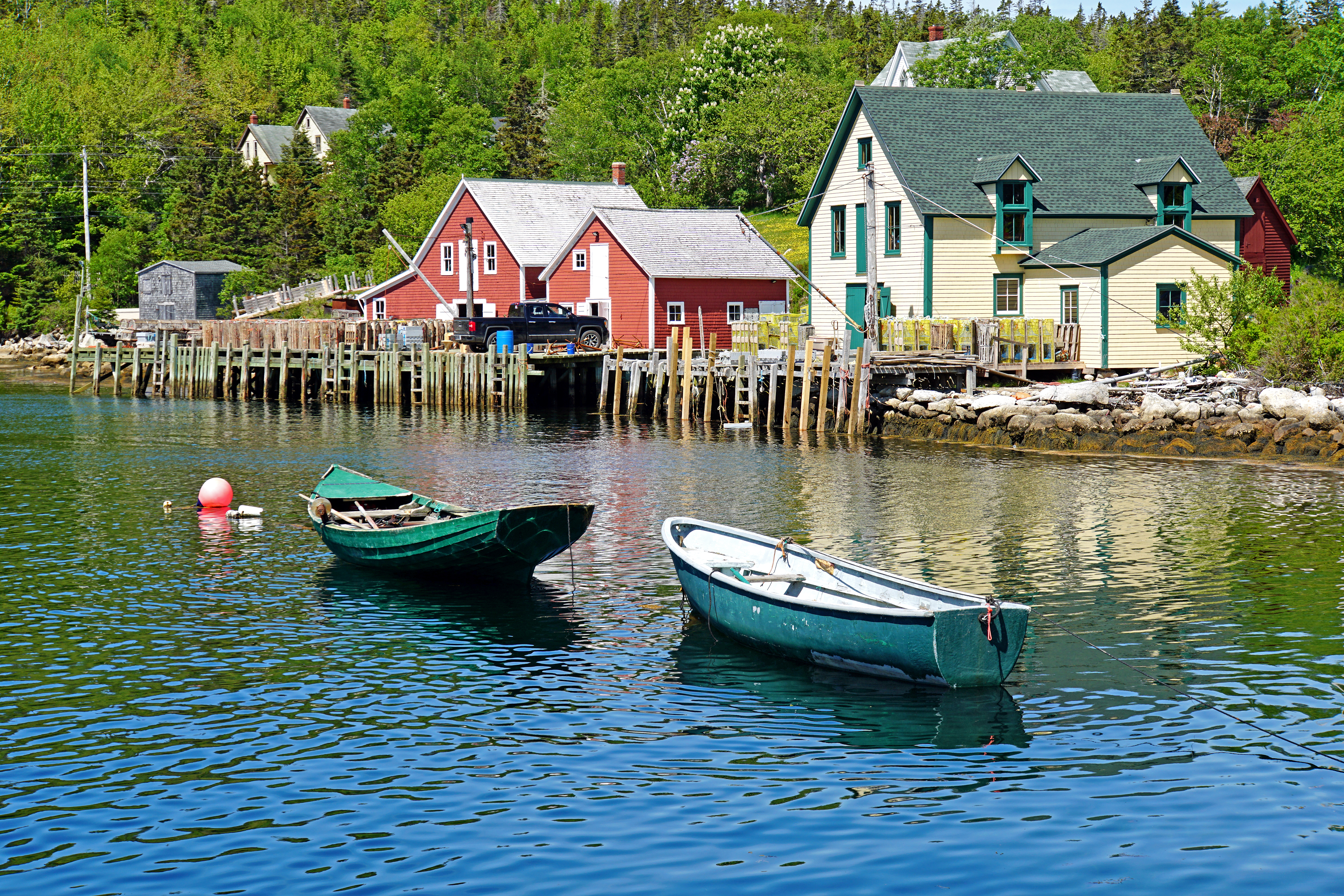
Boats and buildings in Northwest Cove

Northwest Cove is a community and cove in the Canadian province of Nova Scotia, located on the St. Margarets Bay in Lunenburg County.

Administratively Northwest Cove is a General Service Area of the Chester Municipal District, and as such includes the areas also known as Southwest Cove and Coleman's Cove.

Northwest Cove is on the Lighthouse Route (Nova Scotia Route 329).

Several scenes from the television show Haven were shot in the Cove.
