= Panovo =

Panovo Паново
- Selo
- Location within Altai Krai Location within Russia
- Coordinates: 52°59′N 82°08′E
- Country: Russia
- Region: Altai Krai
- District: Rebrikhinsky District
- Time zone: UTC+7:00

Panovo (Russian: Паново) is a rural locality (a selo) and the administrative center of Pavnovsky Selsoviet, Rebrikhinsky District, Altai Krai, Russia. The population was 926 as of 2013. There are 16 streets.

== Geography ==
Panovo is located 17 km southwest of Rebrikha (the district's administrative centre) by road. Molodyozhny is the nearest rural locality.
