= Putilovskaya =

Saint Petersburg Metro station

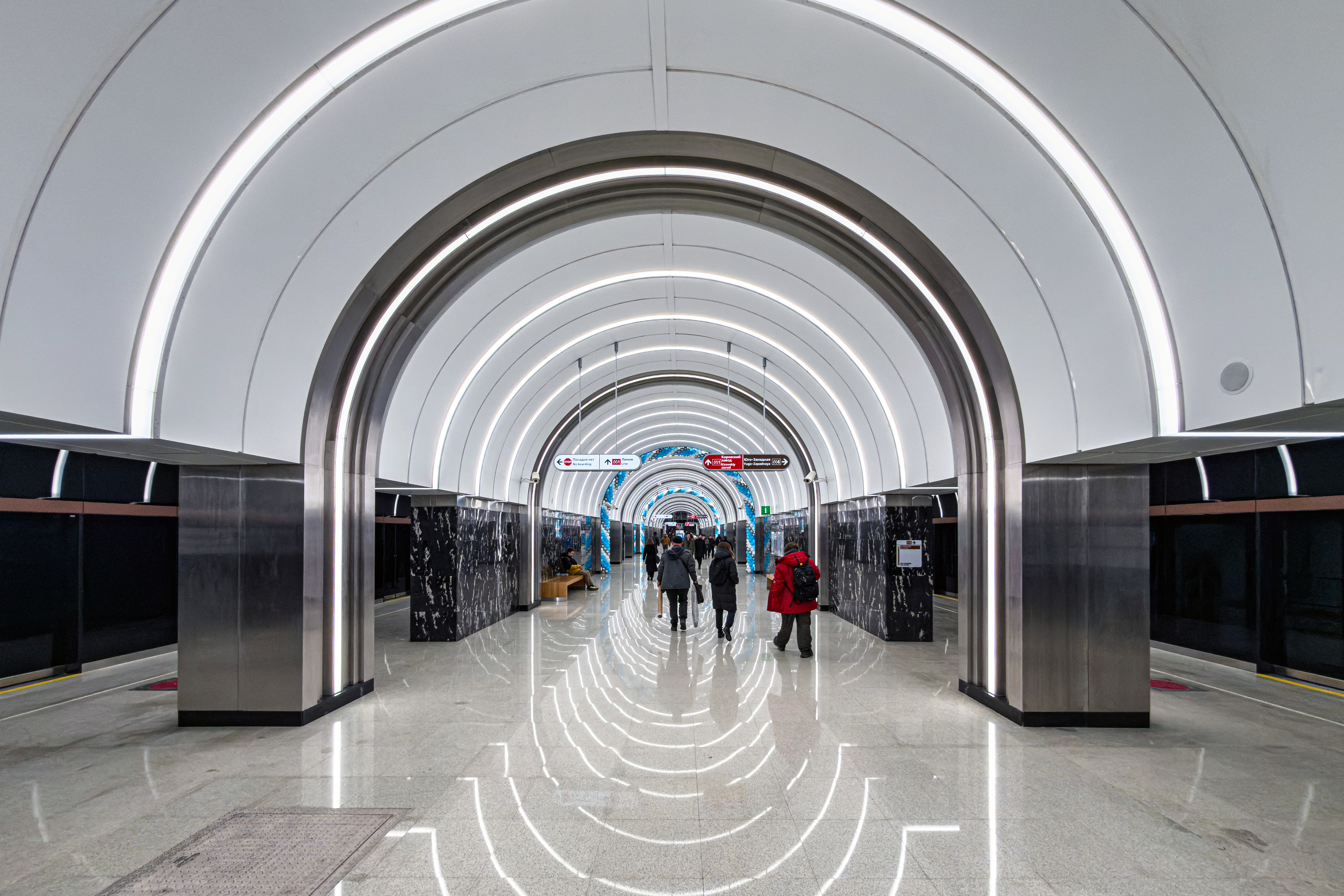
- Station Hall

General information
- Location: Kirovsky District; Saint Petersburg; Russia
- Coordinates: 59.87917°N 30.26528°E
- System: Saint Petersburg Metro station
- Line: Krasnoselsko-Kalininskaya Line
- Platforms: 1 (Island platform)
- Tracks: 2

Construction
- Structure type: Underground
- Depth: ≈58 m (190 ft)

History
- Opened: 26 December 2025
- Electrified: Third rail

Services
Preceding station	Saint Petersburg Metro	Following station
Terminus	Line 6	Yugo-Zapadnaya Terminus
Narvskaya towards Devyatkino	Line 1 transfer at Kirovsky Zavod	Avtovo towards Prospekt Veteranov
Route map
Location

Putilovskaya (Russian: Пути́ловская) is a subway station on Line 6 of Saint Petersburg Metro. It serves as the northeastern terminus of the line. It opened on 26 December 2025 as part of the inaugural section of the line, which consists of only two stations, the other being Yugo-Zapadnaya. It is connected via a transfer corridor to the Kirovsky Zavod station on the Kirovsko-Vyborgskaya Line.

== Main features of the station ==
The station is equipped with platform doors, the tracks are fenced off from the boarding platform, preventing passengers from falling on the way. The third rail is located under the platforms. The entrance lobby is located on the surface, and the station is connected to the lobby by four escalators.
