= Southwest University (disambiguation) =

Southwest University may refer to:

- Southwest University, a public university in Beibei, Chongqing, China
- Southwest University (Louisiana), a private for-profit university in Kenner, Louisiana, United States
- South-West University "Neofit Rilski", a university in Blagoevgrad, Bulgaria, Southeast Europe
- University of the Southwest in Hobbs, New Mexico, United States

== See also ==
- Southwest College, a community college in Houston, Texas, USA
- Southwestern University (disambiguation)
- Southwestern College (disambiguation)
- Southwestern Community College (disambiguation)
