= Krasnoye Selo =

Krasnoye Selo Кра́сное Село́
- Town
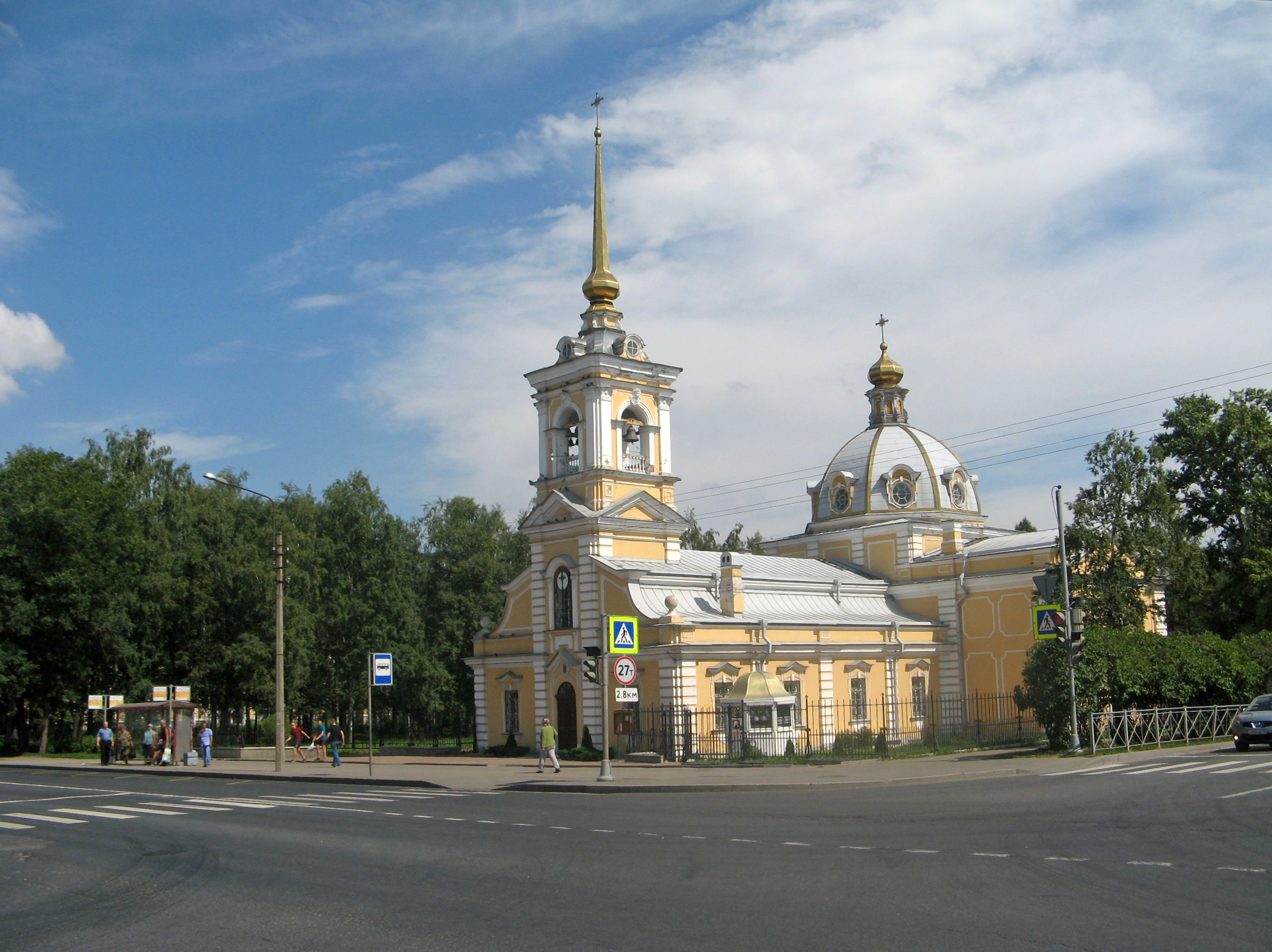
- Trinity Church in Krasnoye Selo

- Location within Saint Petersburg Location within Russia
- Coordinates: 59°44′N 30°5′E
- Country: Russia
- Federal city: Saint Petersburg
- District: Krasnoselsky
- Founded: Early 18th century

Population
  - Total: 44,323

Krasnoye Selo (Russian: Кра́сное Село́, lit. Red (or Beautiful) Village) is a municipal town in Krasnoselsky District of the federal city of Saint Petersburg, Russia. It is located south-southeast of the city center. Population: 44,323 (2010 census); 44,081 (2002 census).

It was founded in the early 18th century as simply Krasnoye, as a suburban village south of Saint Petersburg. In 1764, the village had a paper mill, located near the road leading to Saint etersburg. During the 19th century, Krasnoye Selo developed as a recreational suburb of the capital with numerous summer dachas and villas, including the summer residences of the royals. In 1884, the famous airplane designer Alexander Mozhaysky tested his early monoplane there and achieved a power-assisted take off or 'hop' of 60 to 100 feet (18 to 30 m).

In late pre-revolutionary times, Krasnoye Selo was the location of the annual military manoeuvres presided over by the ruling emperor himself. It was in Krasnoye Selo that on Saturday, July 25, 1914, the council of ministers was held at which Tsar Nicholas II decided to protect Serbia in its conflict with Austria-Hungary, thereby bringing about Russia's entrance in the First World War.

During the Second World War, Krasnoye Selo was under Nazi German occupation from 12 September 1941 to 19 January 1944.

Krasnoye Selo was granted town status in 1925 and was in 1973 was transferred to the jurisdiction of the city of Leningrad (Saint Petersburg's name from 1924 to 1991).
