= Southwest Island, Nova Scotia =

Island in Nova Scotia, Canada

Southwest Island
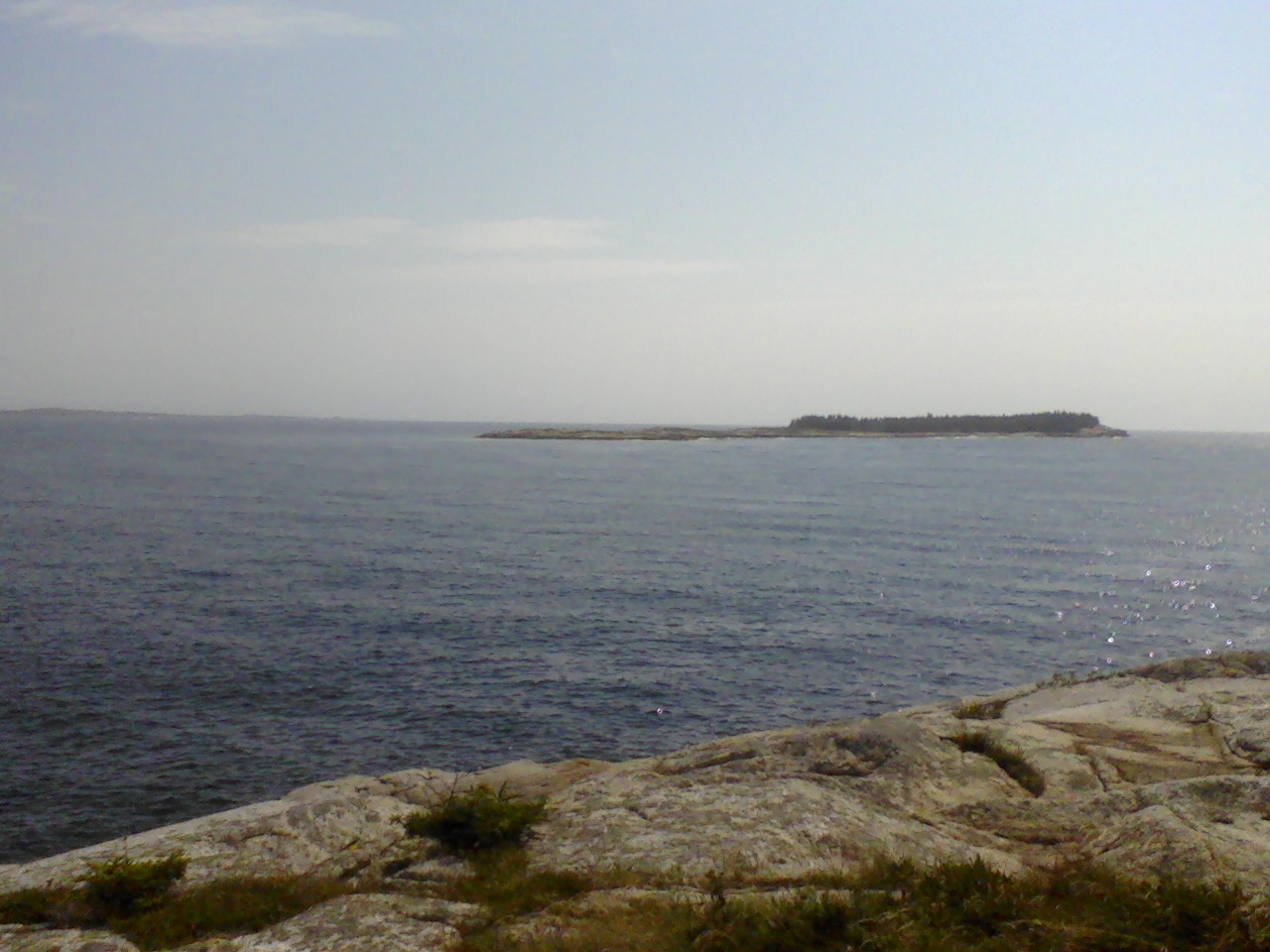
- View from Aspotogan Peninsula

- Location within Nova Scotia

Geography
- Location: St. Margarets Bay
- Coordinates: 44.506866°N 63.994825°W
- Total islands: Three
- Highest elevation: 27 m (89 ft)above mean higher high water

Administration
- Canada
- Province: Nova Scotia
- County: Lunenburg County

Demographics
- Population: 0
- Pop. density: 0/km^{2} (0/sq mi)

Southwest Island is an uninhabited , 30-acre (120,000 m^{2}) island in the southwest corner of St. Margarets Bay, Nova Scotia.
