= Southwest High School =

Southwest High School, Southwestern High School, or South Western High School may refer to:

Southwest

- Southwest High School (El Centro, California)
- Southwest High School (San Diego, California)
- Southwest Miami Senior High School, Miami, Florida
- Southwest High School (Macon, Georgia)
- Southwest Magnet High School, Macon, Georgia
- Southwest High School (Minneapolis)
- Southwest Early College Campus, Kansas City, Missouri
- Southwest High School (Kansas City, Missouri)
- Little Rock Southwest High School, Little Rock, Arkansas
- Southwest R-1 School District, Ludlow, Missouri
- Southwest High School (Washburn, Missouri), Washburn, Missouri
- Lincoln Southwest High School, Lincoln, Nebraska
- Southwest Guilford High School (North Carolina), High Point, North Carolina
- Southwest High School (Jacksonville, North Carolina)
- Southwest High School (Fort Worth, Texas)
- Southwest High School (San Antonio, Texas)
- Green Bay Southwest High School, Green Bay, Wisconsin

Southwestern / South Western

- Southwestern High School (Illinois)
- Southwestern High School (Hanover, Indiana)
- Southwestern Junior-Senior High School, Shelbyville, Indiana
- Southwestern High School (Kentucky), Somerset, Kentucky
- Southwestern Senior High School (Baltimore, Maryland)
- Southwestern High School (Michigan), Detroit, Michigan
- Southwestern High School (New York), West Ellicott, Jamestown, New York
- South Western High School (Hanover, Pennsylvania), Hanover, Pennsylvania
