= Izhora Plateau =

Landform in Russia

- Russian: Ижорская возвышенность
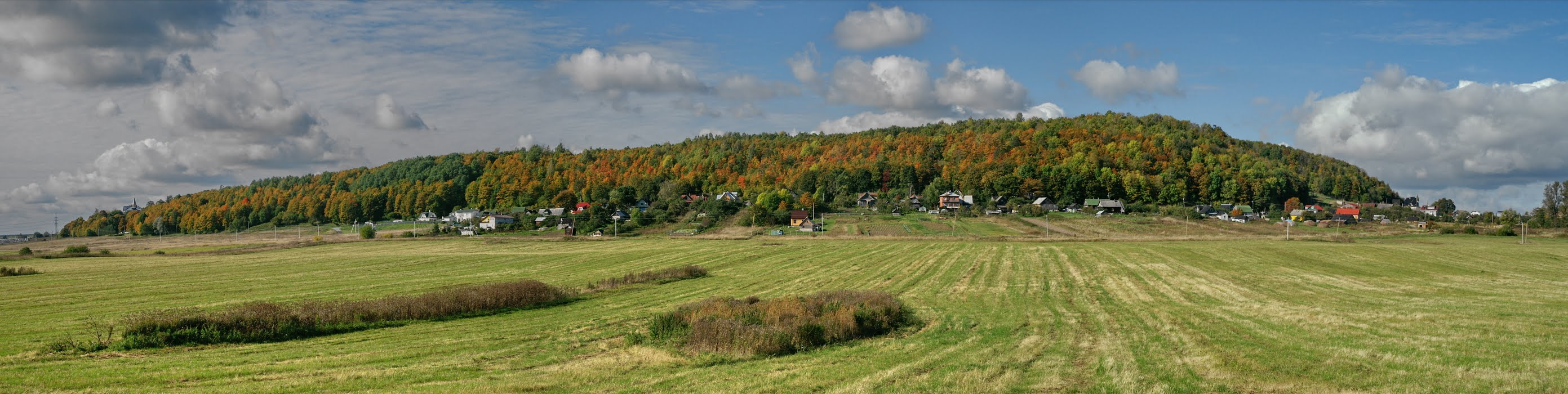
- Highest point - Voronya mountain

Highest point
- Elevation: 176 m (577 ft)

Dimensions
- Area: 24.7 km^{2} (9.5 mi^{2})

Geography
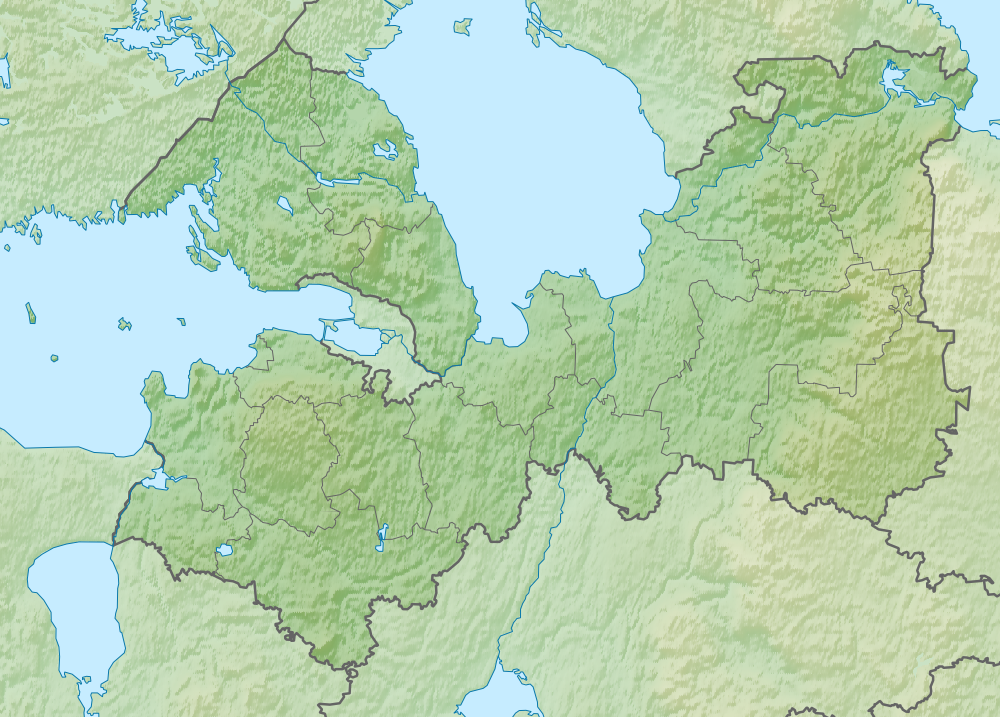
- Location within Leningrad Oblast Location within European Russia
- Country: Russia
- Federal subject: Leningrad Oblast
- Range coordinates: 59°30′00″N 29°35′00″E

The Izhora Plateau (Russian: Ижорская возвышенность) is an elevated landform on Ordovician limestone bedrock in the southwestern part of Leningrad Oblast, between the Gulf of Finland in the north and the Luga River in the south.

Its northern edge is formed by the erosional cliff known as the Baltic-Ladoga Klint. It is formed by pre-Quaternary rocks. The highest part of the plateau is the Orekhovaya hill of Duderhof Heights at 176 m, situated in its extreme northeastern part. The plateau is mostly covered by agricultural lands.

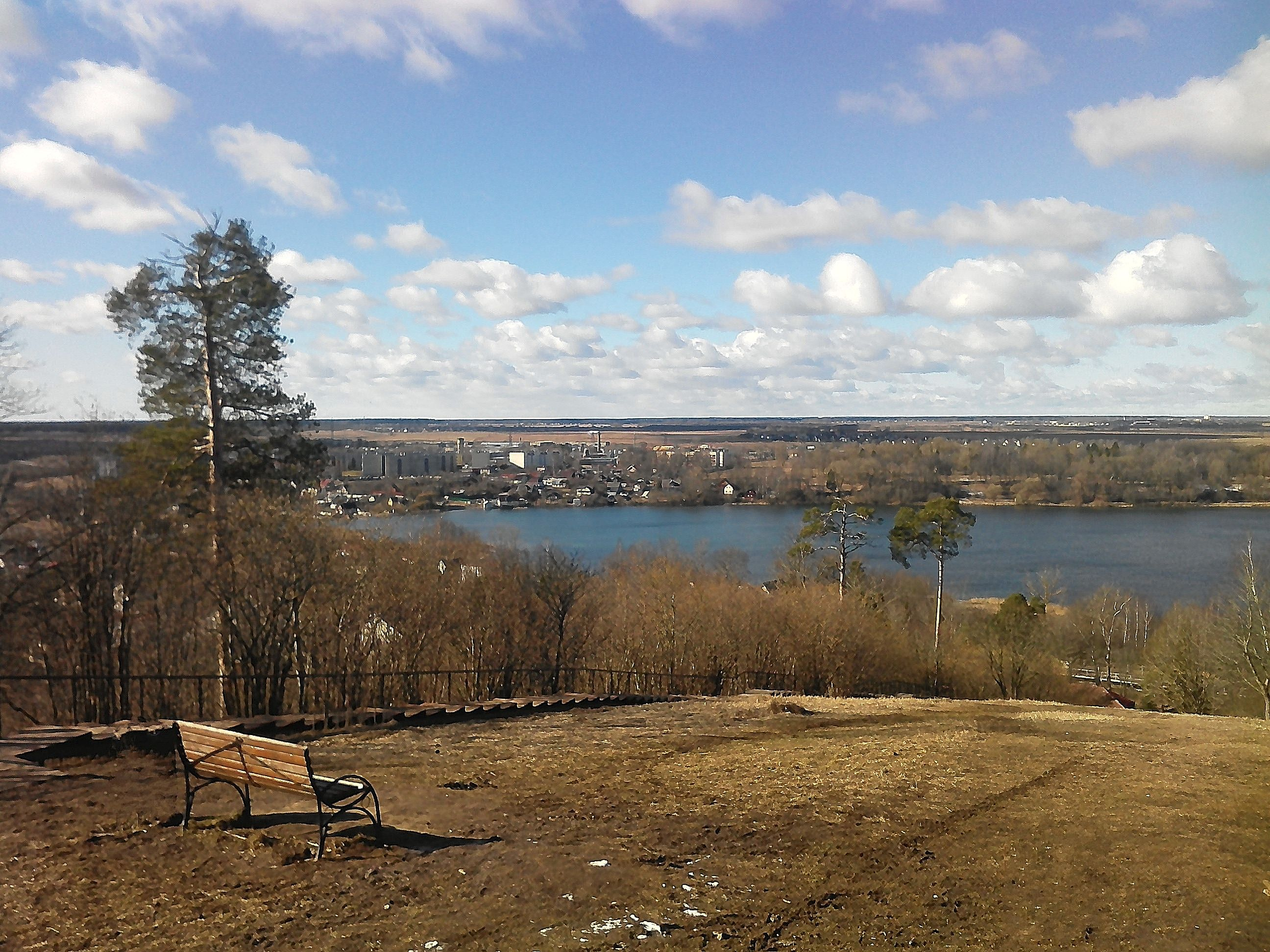
View from the observation deck of Voronya mountain towards the Duderhof Lake.

== History ==
It used to be the heartland of the historical region known as Ingria.
