= South Western Railway (disambiguation) =

South Western Railway is a train company in England.

South Western Railway or Southwestern Railroad (or similar) may also refer to:

== Australia ==
- South West Rail Link in Sydney, Australia
- South Western railway line, Queensland, Australia
- South Western Railway, Western Australia

== United Kingdom ==
- South Western Railway (2017-2025) - the previous operator of the South Western Railway franchise
- Glasgow and South Western Railway in Scotland
- London and South Western Railway in England
- South West Main Line in England

== United States ==
- Southwestern Railroad (Georgia), predecessor of the Central of Georgia Railway
- Southwestern Railroad (Kentucky), predecessor of the Southern Railway (1876-1889)
- Southwestern Railroad (New Mexico), presently operating
- Southwestern Railroad (Tennessee), predecessor of the Nashville, Chattanooga and St. Louis Railway (1852-1877)

== Other ==
- Southwestern Railways in Ukraine
- South Western Railway (South Africa)
- South Western Railway zone in India

== See also ==
- South and Western Railway, see Clinchfield Railroad
- South West Trains, formerly South Western Railway (UK)
