= Storage World Conference =

Storage World Conference (sometimes called SWC) was a conference for data storage, networking, and IT professionals in the United States. Associated with the Association of Storage Networking Professionals, SWC was held from 2001 through 2006. The event was oriented towards end users of data storage equipment and software, and included a professional certification program to encourage attendance at educational sessions.

In 2001, conference organizers decided to proceed with the event in San Jose, California, despite the September 11 attacks in New York and Washington, DC. Between 2001 and 2002, attendance at the event doubled. In 2002, protesters gathered outside the conference in San Jose during the keynote by StorageTek CEO Pat Martin.
