= Southwest Freeway =

Southwest Freeway may refer to:

- Southwest Freeway (Houston), a section of Interstate 69/U.S. Route 59 in Houston, Texas, U.S.
- Southwest Freeway (Washington, D.C.), a section of Interstate 395 in Washington, D.C., U.S.
