= Southwest Cove, Lunenburg County, Nova Scotia =

Community in Nova Scotia, Canada

Coordinates: 44.525°N 64.012°W

Southwest Cove in Nova Scotia

Southwest Cove is a Canadian rural community located in Lunenburg County, Nova Scotia.

The community is located on the Aspotogan Peninsula and is administratively part of the Chester Municipal District, the municipality that covers the eastern half of Lunenburg County. Most of the community fronts Highway 329.

== History ==
There was a Mi’kmaq settlement at Clam Pond.

One of the first immigrants was "foreign protestant" James Boutilier (1760-1841) and his wife Susan Elizabeth Marriete. He moved from French Village to Southwest Cove. Eventually, people migrated from Southwest Cove to nearby Northwest Cove.

According to DesBarres’ map, Southwest Cove seems to be the first village occupied on the Aspotogan Peninsula. In fact, in 1765 it appears as the largest community along the coast between Chester and Halifax.
