= Yugo-Zapad Municipal Okrug =

Municipal okrug in Krasnoselsky District, Saint Petersburg

Yugo-Zapad Municipal Okrug on the 2006 map of St. Petersburg

Yugo-Zapad Municipal Okrug (Russian: муниципа́льный о́круг Ю́го-За́пад) or South-West Municipal Okrug, formerly called Municipal Okrug #37 (муниципа́льный о́круг № 37), is a municipal okrug of Krasnoselsky District of the federal city of St. Petersburg, Russia. Population: 66,746 (2010 census); 64,261 (2002 census).
