= Yugo-Zapadnaya (Saint Petersburg Metro) =

Saint Petersburg Metro station

Coordinates: 59°51′33″N 30°13′49″E

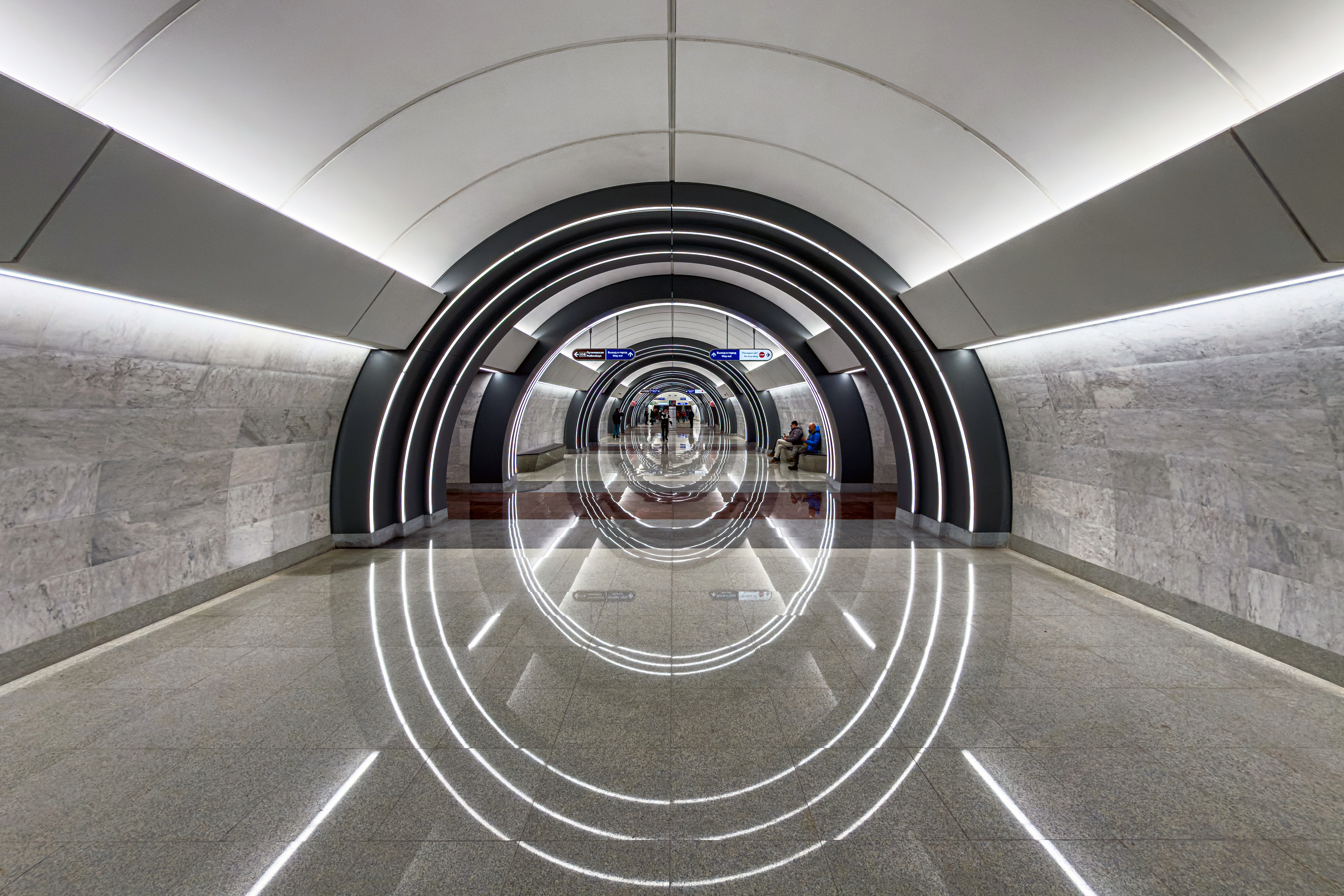

General information

History
- Opened: 26 December 2025
Route map
Location

Yugo-Zapadnaya (Russian: Ю́го-За́падная, South-Western) is a subway station on Line 6 of Saint Petersburg Metro. It serves as the southwestern terminus of the line. It was opened on 26 December 2025 as part of the inaugural section of the line, which consisted of only two stations, Yugo-Zapadnaya and Putilovskaya.
