= Hacketts Cove =

Community in Nova Scotia, Canada

Coordinates: 44°34′6.5″N 63°55′21.5″W

Hacketts Cove in Nova Scotia

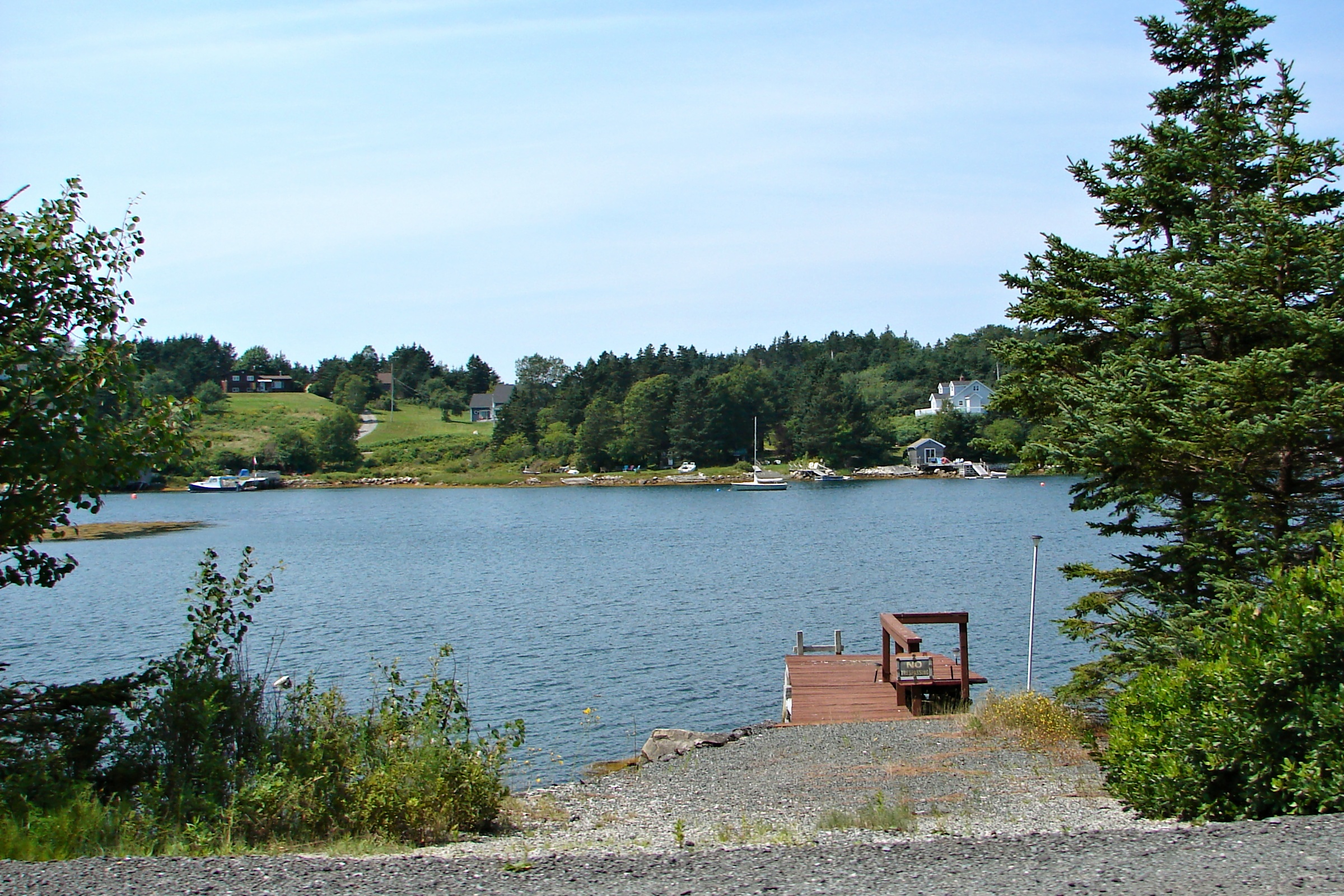
Hacketts Cove

Hacketts Cove is a community in the Canadian province of Nova Scotia, located in Halifax Regional Municipality on the Chebucto Peninsula.
