= Southwest College =

Southwest College is a community college based in Houston, Texas. Part of the Houston Community College System, it serves the Southwest and West portions of the city, as well as the nearby suburbs of Missouri City and Stafford. Southwest College consists of six satellite campuses: Alief Campus, Alief Continuing Education Center, Gulfton Center, Missouri City Campus, Stafford Campus and West Loop Center.

== Alief Campus ==
The HCC Alief Campus is located in West Houston in the former Chevron building off Westheimer Road near Beltway 8. The campus, which serves the Alief District, opened in January 2008, replacing the Alief Center on Bissonnet in Southwest Houston, which is now home of the Alief Continuing Education Center.

== Alief Continuing Education Center ==
The HCC Alief Continuing Education Center is located in Southwest Houston on Bissonnet. Formerly known as Alief Center before the Alief Campus opened, it now serves as a center for post-graduates desiring to continue their studies.

== Gulfton Center ==
The HCC Gulfton Center is located in Southwest Houston in the Gulfton District. It mainly consists of classes devoted to new international students learning English.

== Missouri City Campus ==
The HCC Missouri City Campus is located in unincorporated Fort Bend County and serves Missouri City. Missouri City always had an HCC campus in the vicinity; the current campus opened in August 2008 located in the Sienna Springs subdivision off Highway 6, replacing the former Missouri City Center located at the intersection of Cartwright Road and Texas Parkway.

== Stafford Campus ==
The HCC Stafford Campus is located in Stafford. The campus consists of four segments located along Cash Road and surrounding areas: the Scarella Center with the new learning hub, the original Stafford Campus, the Greenbriar Annex (home to arts programs) and the Applied Technology Center.

== West Loop Center ==
The HCC West Loop Center is located near the Uptown District of Houston off West Loop near Southwest Freeway and also serves Bellaire.
