= Narvskaya =

Saint Petersburg Metro Station

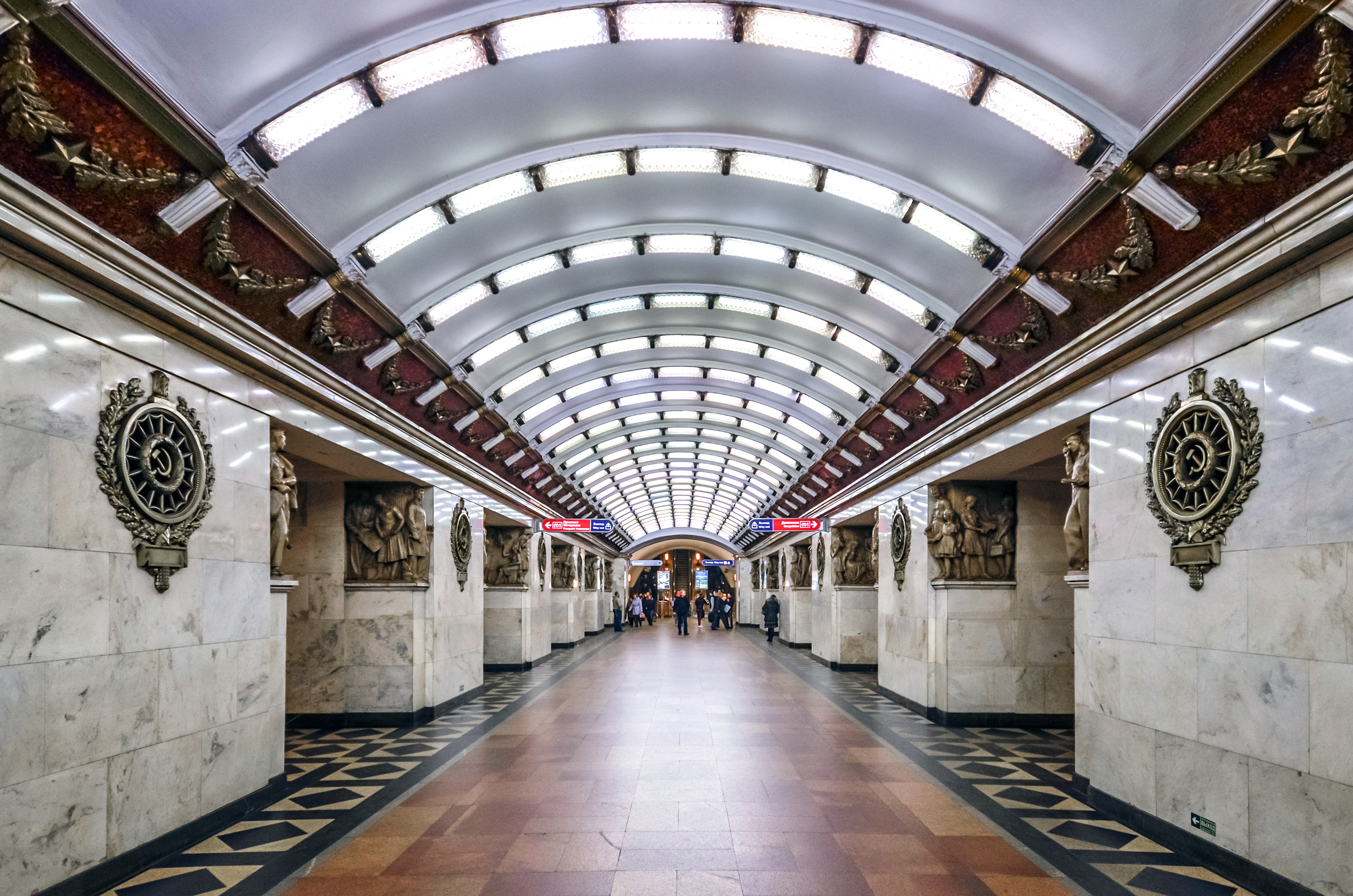
- Station Hall

General information
- Location: Kirovsky District; Saint Petersburg; Russia
- Coordinates: 59°54′04.35″N 30°16′29.65″E
- System: Saint Petersburg Metro station
- Owner: Saint Petersburg Metro
- Line: Kirovsko–Vyborgskaya Line
- Platforms: 1 (Island platform)
- Tracks: 2

Construction
- Structure type: Underground
- Depth: ≈52 m (171 ft)

History
- Opened: 15 November 1955
- Electrified: Third rail

Services
Preceding station	Saint Petersburg Metro	Following station
Baltiyskaya towards Devyatkino	Line 1	Kirovsky Zavod towards Prospekt Veteranov
Route map
Location

Narvskaya (Russian: На́рвская) is a subway station in Saint Petersburg, Russia on the Kirovsko-Vyborgskaya Line between the stations Baltiyskaya and Kirovsky Zavod.

The station was opened on 15 November 1955, as a part of the first stage of Saint Petersburg Metro from Avtovo to Ploschad Vosstania.

== Overview ==
When the construction of the station began, it was named after the Ploshchad Stachek (Russian: Площад Стачек, lit. 'Square of the Strikes'), but several years before it has been opened, the name was changed to "Stalinskaya" after Joseph Stalin. When the Soviet leader died in 1953 and de-Stalinization under Nikita Khrushchev began, the station was renamed "Narvskaya" after the Narva Triumphal Gate, located opposite of the entrance to the station. The name indicates that once there was a gate of the road to Narva.

Despite the name change, it still contains a large number of decorative elements related to Stalin and his cult of personality.

The irregular-shaped pavilion is built in the neoclassical style with a dome at one end. The station is lined in white marble with many bronze inserts. The walls of the vestibule are painted red and balustrades of escalators are decorated with red plastic. There is a decorative strip of red stone on the upper section of the walls in the underground hall, and the centre of the station's platform is constructed with red granite.

Connections to public transport
Bus commercial routes	K-1, K-2, K-6, K-20, K-66, K-154, K-169, K-177, K-195, K-306, K-404
Bus routes	2, 6, 35, 35A, 66, 73.
Trolleybus route	20.

== Concourse ==
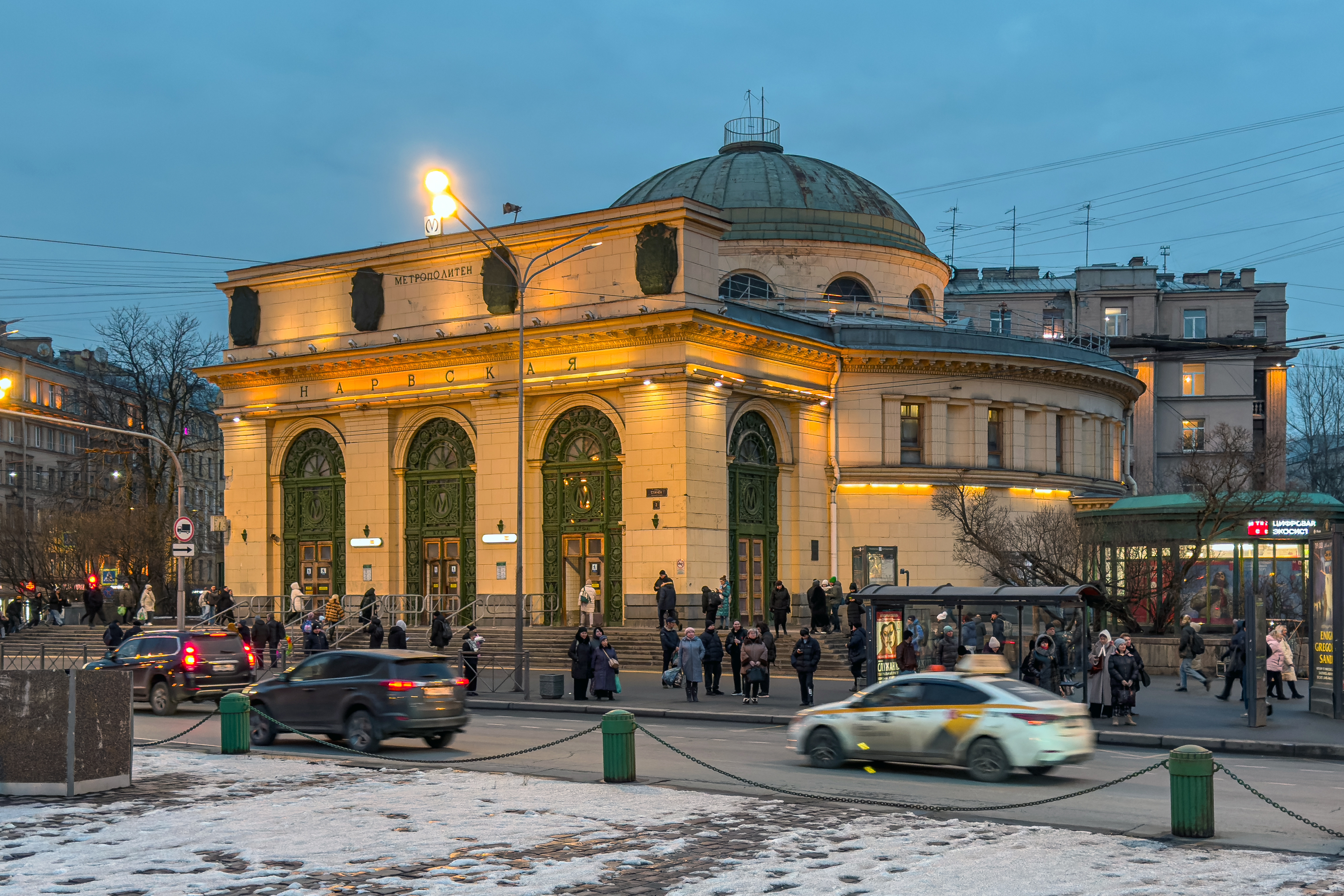
Vestibule of Narvskaya

The station has one concourse, located at Ploshchad Stachek, at the corner of Staro-Peterhofskiy Prospekt and Ivan Chernyh Street. The vestibule of the station was designed by architects I. V. Vasilyev, D. S. Goldgor, S. B. Speransky and engineer O. V. Ivanova.

The wall of the vestibule was planned to be decorated with the engraving of the following quote of Stalin:

Не исключена возможность, что именно Россия явится страной пролагающей путь к социализму… Надо откинуть отжившее представление о том, что только Европа может указывать нам путь.
There is a chance that Russia will be the country to lead the way to socialism... One must discard the obsolete idea that only Europe can show us the way.

— Joseph Stalin

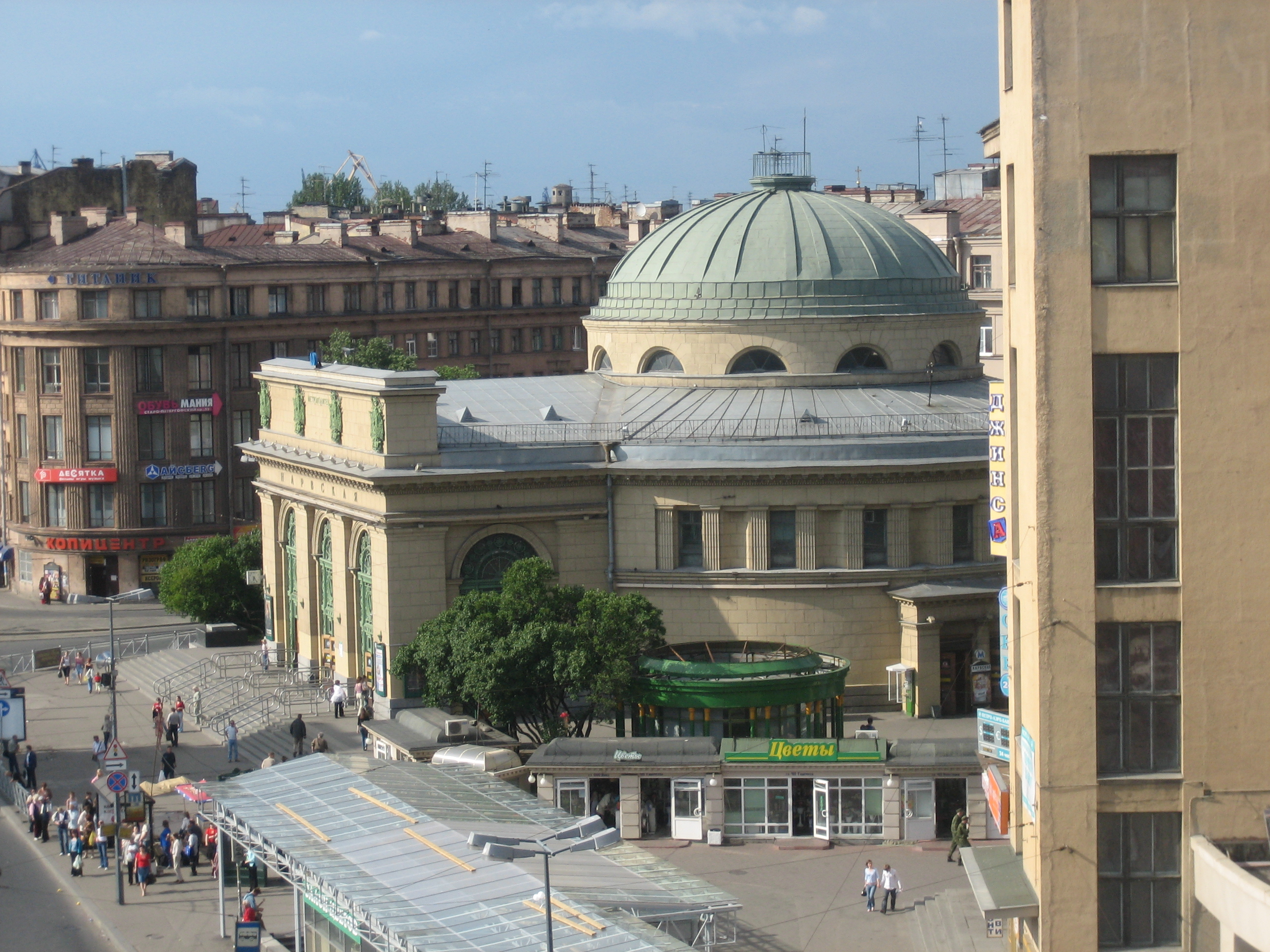
Concourse, behind it there is Staro-Peterhofskiy Prospekt

Over the escalator run there is a relief reading "Glory to Work!" (Russian: Слава труду!, romanized: Slava trudu!), sculpted by G. V. Kosov, A. G. Ovsyannikov, V. G. Stamov, and A. P. Timchenko. This area had been planned to contain an engraving of Stalin.

In recent years, the station has struggled under the large volume of passenger traffic. Its three escalators have not been sufficient to carry passengers during the morning and afternoon rush hours. The escalators were built in the 1950s and they require occasional repairs. In peak hours, the station works only in one direction: either on the entrance or on exit.

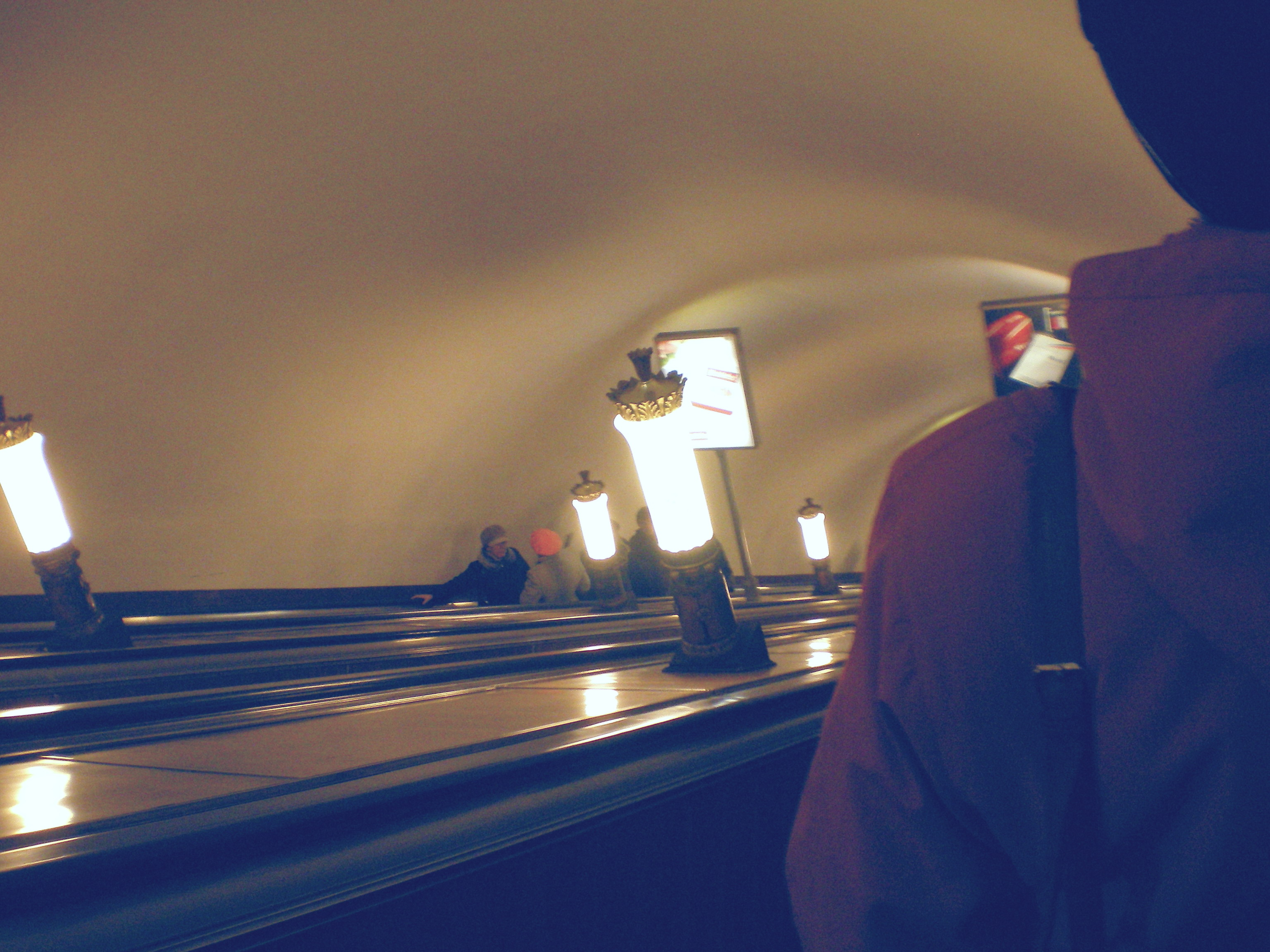
Escalator "crown" lights

In 2012, the station was closed for a 14-month reconstruction, which was planned to include the replacement of the three outdated escalators with four new ones.

== Architectural appearance of the underground hall ==
Three lines of escalators deliver passengers to the underground hall, which is located at a depth of 52 metres (171 ft). These escalators are illuminated by highly-artistic fixtures - cylinders topped with a bronze colour metal crown. Fixtures and the housing of the escalator motors are made of steel and aluminium.

Below the escalators small rooms are located closed off the main area. The main hall is illuminated gracefully with fixtures located on the walls in groups of three.

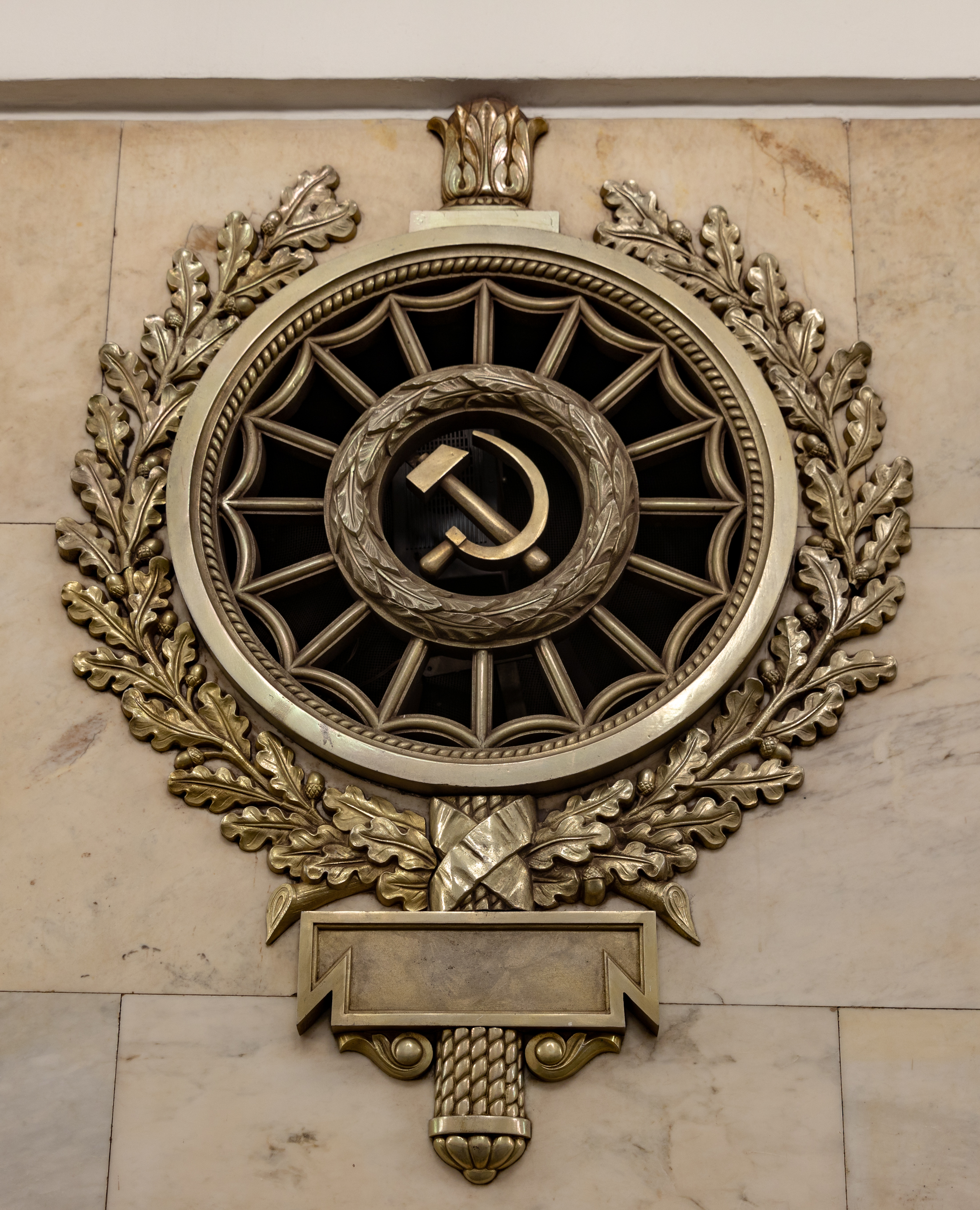
Ventilating lattice with a hammer and sickle

The underground hall of the pylon station was built under the direction of architects Alexander Vasilev, David Goldgor, Sergey Speransky, and engineer O. V. Ivanova. The subjects of the station reflect "the valour of labour of the Soviet people", and many elements and decorations represent Soviet-era symbols: hammer and sickles, red stars, and images of red flags.

On walls opposite the platforms, there are decorative lattices with the inscription «1955», the year when the station was opened.

Fluorescent lamps on consecutive arches of the ceiling illuminate the central hall, merging in the distance to create the impression of a continuous shiny surface.

Originally there was a large mosaic panel "Stalin on a tribune" Russian: Сталин на трибуне, romanized: Stalin na tribune located on a prominent wall of the central underground hall. This mosaic was constructed by the director of the Academy of Arts of the Soviet Union, Aleksandr Gerasimov. Stalin's bust was planned to be displayed on a colourful background; however, in 1961, after the 22nd Congress of the Communist Party of the Soviet Union, the panel was covered by a false wall of marble, with a photo of the original panel included in the book dedicated to the line's opening.

There was a boardroom in an enclosed space. Later this premise was used as the linear point for machinists of the Depot "Avtovo" which is still there. According to machinists, the wall with a mosaic is still displayed and staff-only premises have been expanded to the following pair of columns, but during the organization of the Museum of Saint-Petersburg Metro a museum of underground this mosaic has not been displayed, and its location and condition are not known.

Sidewalls of the pylons of the central underground hall are decorated with high reliefs depicting people of different professions:

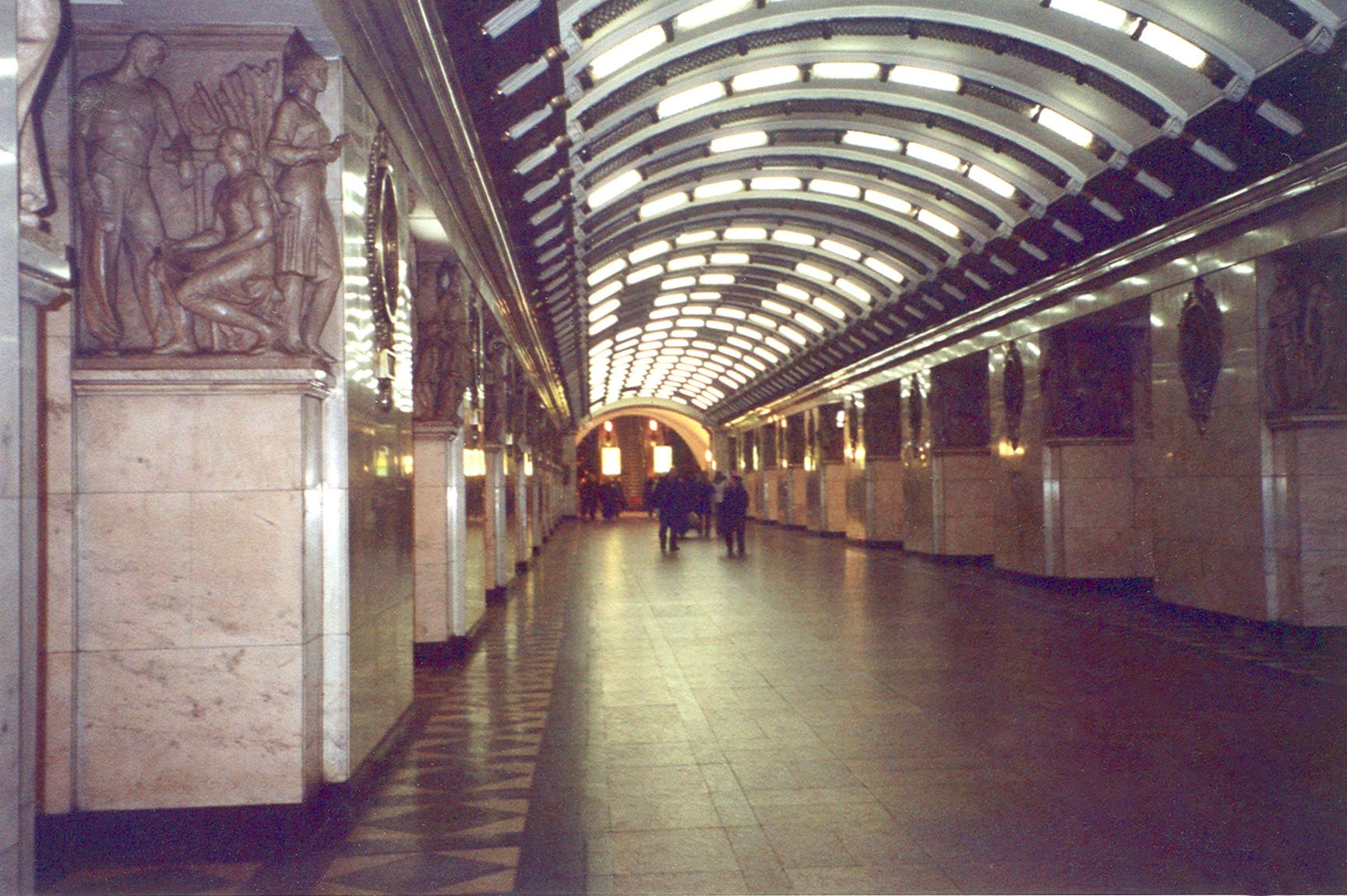
Overview of the underground hall. On the left there is a pilon with the high relief "Plant selection breeders".

High reliefs of Narvskaya
Professions	Sculptor	In Russian
Peoples of art	Maria Litovchenko	Мария Тимофеевна Литовченко
Collective farmers	Mikhail Anikushin	Михаил Константинович Аникушин
Naval architects	Mikhail Gabe	Михаил Руфимович Габе
Scholars	Elena Chelpanova	Елена Георгиевна Челпанова
Plant selection breeders	Valentina Rybalko	Валентина Лаврентьевна Рыбалко
Tube builders	Alexander Ignatiev	Александр Михайлович Игнатьев
Textilemen	Lubov Hohlina	Любовь Михайловна Холина
Founders	P. Kulikov	П. А. Куликов
Seamen	V. Sichev	В. И. Сычёв
Doctors	N. Slobodinskiy	Н. К. Слободинский
Red soldiers	V. Pirozhkov	В. О. Пирожков
Builders	Alexander Chernitsky	Александр Николаевич Черницкий

== Facts and prospects ==
The 2.5-kilometre (1.6 mi) run between Narvskaya and Kirovsky Zavod stations is the longest on the initial stage of the Saint Petersburg Metro. To meet the schedule for the opening, fast construction methods were employed. Information displays the information for passengers on platforms of stations: under the phrase "the train follows to station" one of two variants was highlighted: Avtovo or Narvskaya.

The first stage of Saint Petersburg Metro was laid practically on an existing branch of a tram. To accustom passengers to use new transport, the tram line has been transferred on small streets, but at Narvskaya metro station the tram ring has remained.

After these tunnels ceased to be used for transport Line 1, they were used for storing Line 2 trains overnight. When in 1972 Depot 3 "Moskovskoye" was constructed, all trains of Line 2 began to spend the night on the line.

Since the beginning of the 21st century, the station has been functioning continuously under a maximum load. In 2007, the Administration of the underground announced the full closure of close the station on 2010 due to reparations and replacement of escalators. In 2008 the tender for manufacture and delivery of four escalators was won by factory Universalmash.

On summer 2009, informations of the project approval were published and plans specified the middle of 2010 as the beginning of work.

This template requires you to use a title as the title parameter and one of the succession box headers as its header parameter.
Preceded by Gostiny dvor (Aug 2008 - Aug 2009); Gorkovskaya (Oct 2008 - end of 2009 /planned/)	Major repair with full closed end of 2009-2011/planned/	Succeeded by Grazhdansky Prospekt (2011-…/planned/)
