= Leninsky Prospekt (Saint Petersburg Metro) =

Saint Petersburg Metro Station

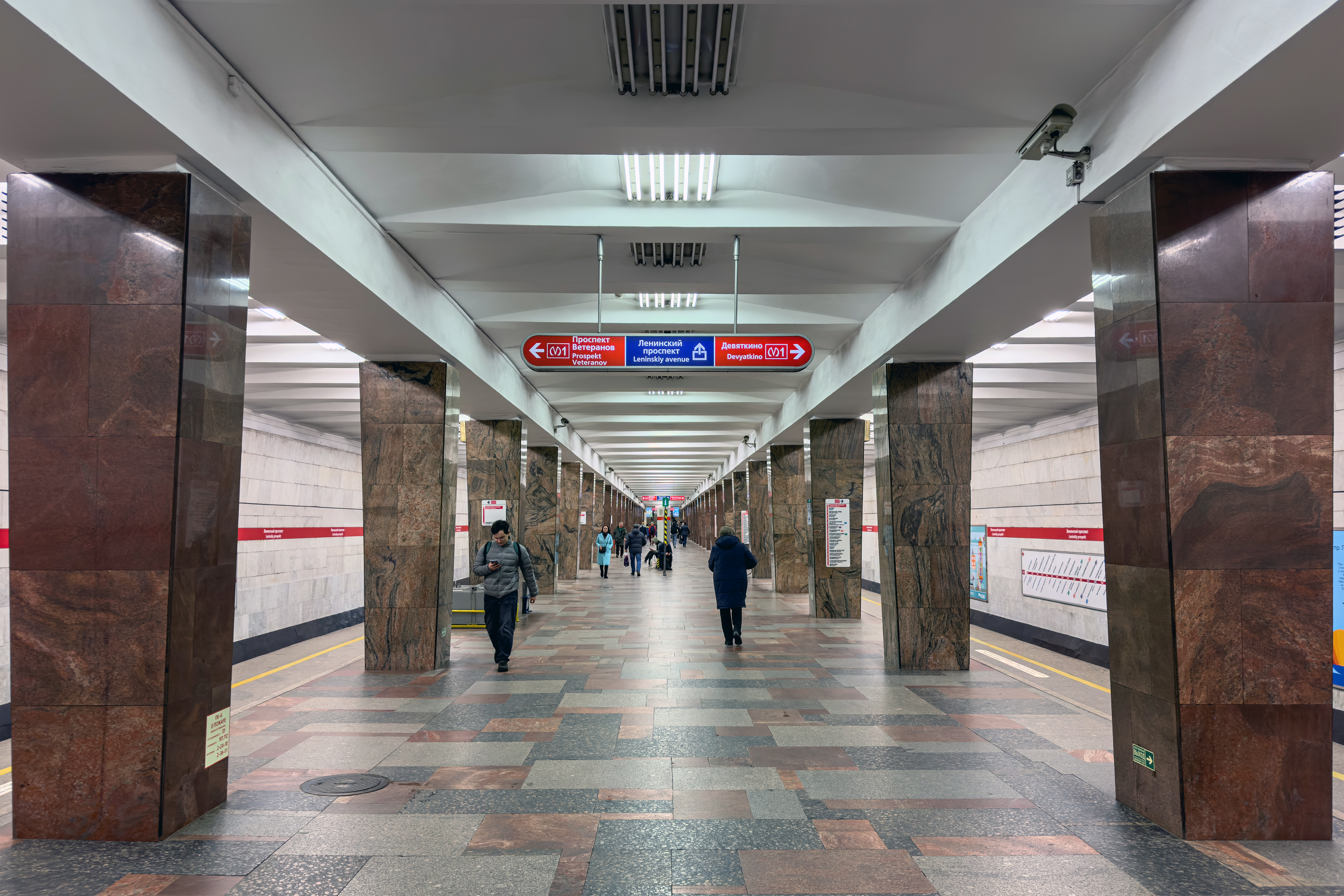
- Station Hall

General information
- Location: Kirovsky District; Saint Petersburg; Russia
- Coordinates: 59°51′07″N 30°16′06″E
- System: Saint Petersburg Metro station
- Operator: Saint Petersburg Metro
- Line: Kirovsko–Vyborgskaya Line
- Platforms: 1 (Island platform)
- Tracks: 2

Construction
- Structure type: Underground
- Depth: 8 m (26 ft)
- Accessible: Yes

History
- Opened: 5 October 1977
- Electrified: Third rail

Services
Preceding station	Saint Petersburg Metro	Following station
Avtovo towards Devyatkino	Line 1	Prospekt Veteranov Terminus
Location

Leninsky Prospekt (Russian: Ле́нинский проспе́кт, English: Leninsky Avenue) is a station on the Kirovsko-Vyborgskaya Line of the Saint Petersburg Metro, located between Avtovo and Prospekt Veteranov.

The station was opened on 29 September 1977 in the section between Avtovo and Prospekt Veteranov, replacing the temporary surface station Dachnoye. It is named after the street of the same name, where one of the entrances is located.

== Station facilities ==
There is no above-ground pavilion; entrance to the station is provided through underground pedestrian crossings, with exits onto Leninsky Prospekt and Bulvar Novatorov. Because of the station's shallow depth, neither exit has escalators.

Leninsky Prospekt is a shallow column station with a depth of 8 metres (26 ft). The underground hall was constructed as a project of the architects A. S. Getskin and Ye. I. Val and the engineer A. N. Yakovlev. The design of the station echoes Lenin's Mausoleum. The platforms and the columns, which widen at the top, are faced with red Karelian granite. Unpolished white marble is used to decorate the walls.

In the summer of 2012, the exit onto Leninsky Prospekt was equipped with the first Metro lift in St. Petersburg for people with disabilities.

== History ==
The station was constructed using the same cut and cover method as the neighboring stations Avtovo and Prospekt Veteranov.

Until the early 1990s the station was notable in its quadruple commemoration of the name of Lenin in its friezes: "V. I. Lenin Metro of Leningrad, order of Lenin. Leninsky Prospekt Station." Another station with same situation was Ploshchad Lenina.

== See also ==
- Leninsky Prospekt (Moscow metro)
