= Baltiyskaya (Saint Petersburg Metro) =

Saint Petersburg Metro Station

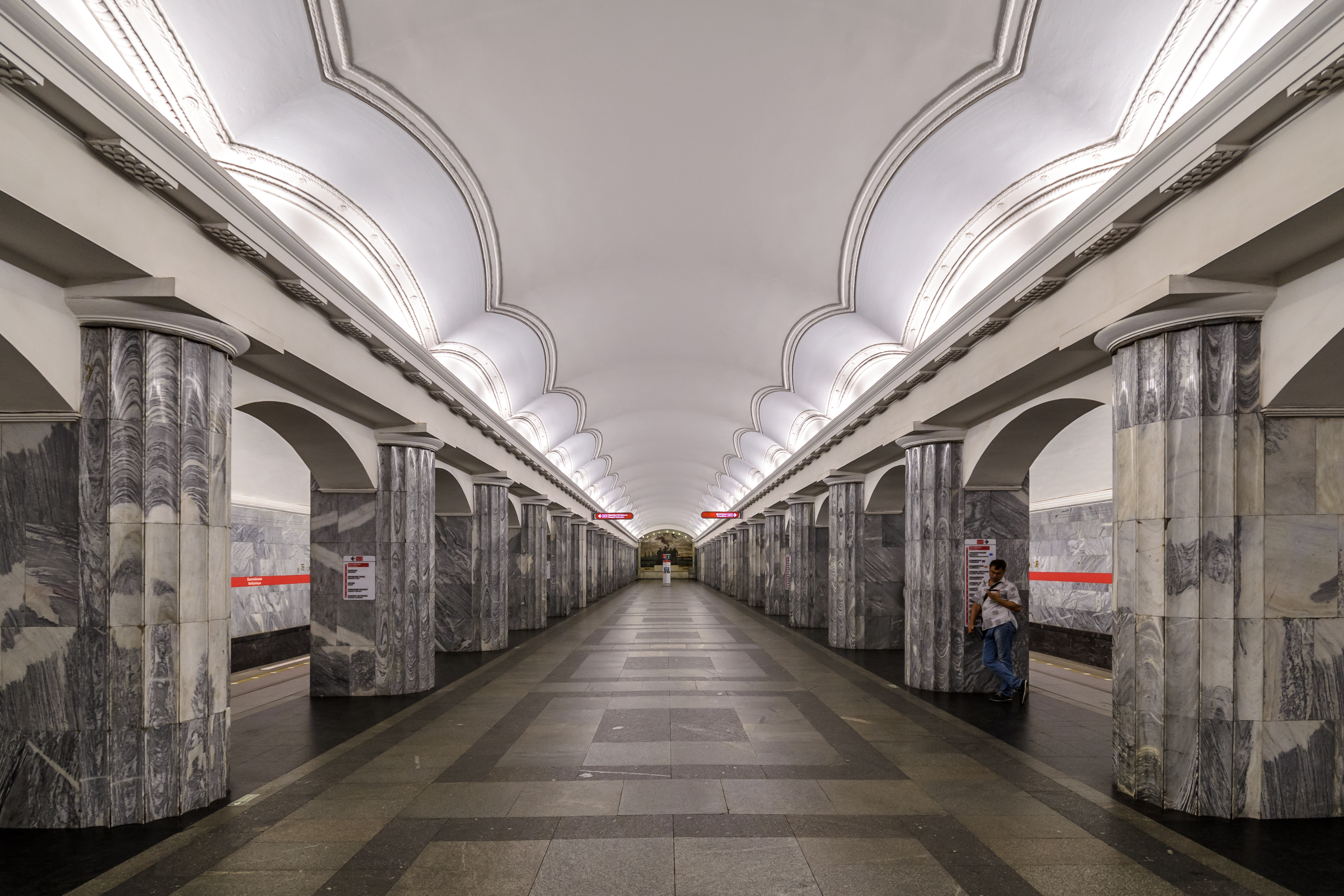
- Station Hall

General information
- Location: Admiralteysky District; Saint Petersburg; Russia
- Coordinates: 59°54′25.97″N 30°17′58.26″E
- System: Saint Petersburg Metro station
- Owner: Saint Petersburg Metro
- Line: Kirovsko–Vyborgskaya Line
- Platforms: 1 (Island platform)
- Tracks: 2
- Connections: Baltiysky Rail Terminal

Construction
- Structure type: Underground
- Depth: ≈57 m (187 ft)

History
- Opened: 15 November 1955
- Electrified: Third rail

Services
| Preceding station | Saint Petersburg Metro | Following station |
|---|---|---|
| Tekhnologichesky Institut towards Devyatkino | Line 1 | Narvskaya towards Prospekt Veteranov |
Route map
Location

Baltiyskaya (Russian: Балти́йская) is a station on the Kirovsko-Vyborgskaya Line of the Saint Petersburg Metro, located between Narvskaya and Tekhnologichesky Institut.

Baltiyskaya is an underground bore-tunnel tri-span station with one exit and middle tunnel of full length. It is situated 57 metres (187 ft) under surface level. The exit feeds into Baltiysky Rail Terminal building. A second exit, which will lead from the opposite side of the underground platform, is also planned. For the decoration of the station Ural marble was used, representing the silver colour of the sea. Baltiyskaya station was opened on 15 November 1955 as the first part of Saint Petersburg's metro system. The project name for the station had been Baltiyskiy Vokzal.

== Gallery ==
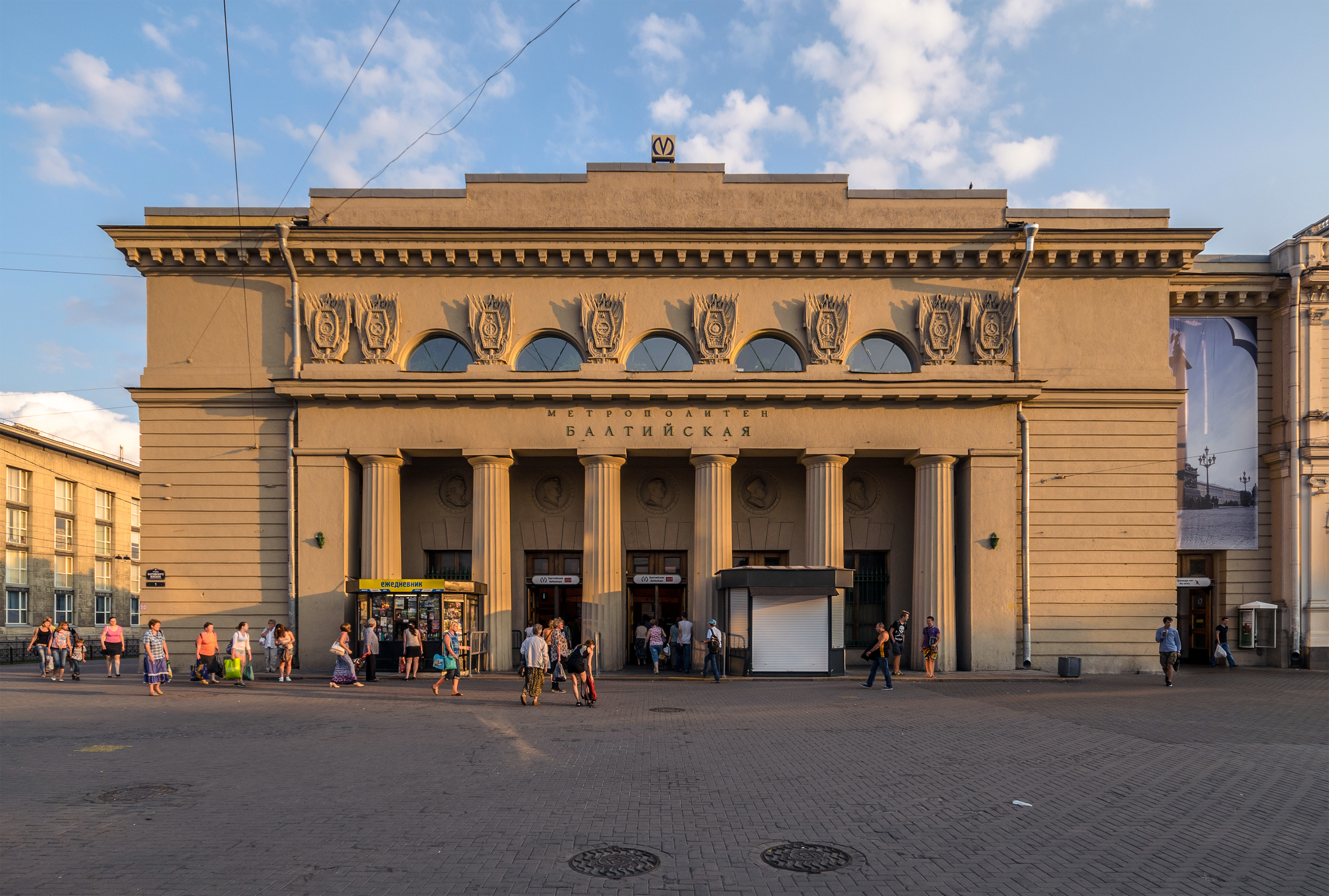
Pavilion Building
