= Vyborgskaya (Saint Petersburg Metro) =

Saint Petersburg Metro Station

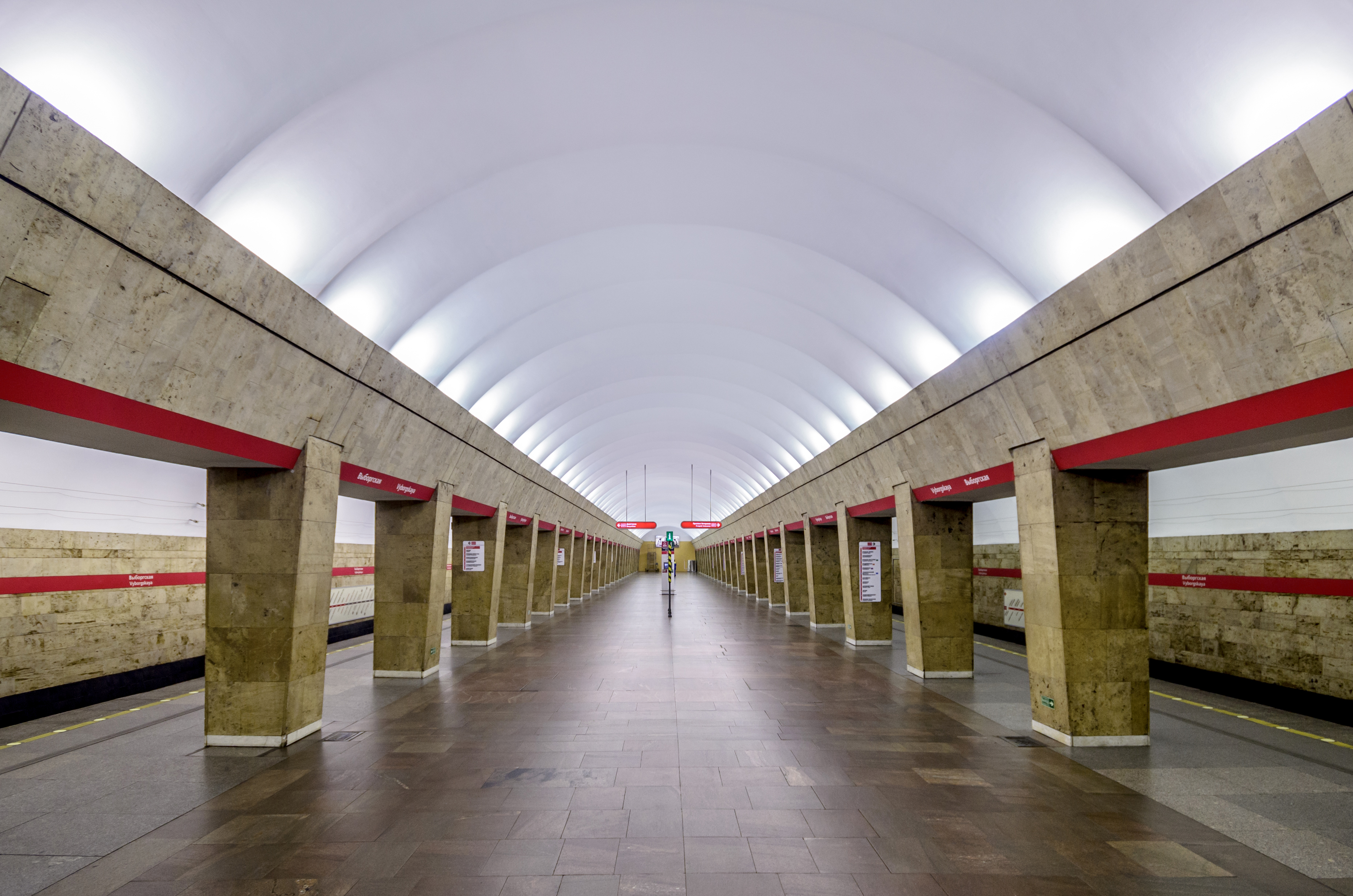
- Station Hall

General information
- Location: Vyborgsky District; Saint Petersburg; Russia
- Coordinates: 59°58′15.77″N 30°20′50.6″E
- System: Saint Petersburg Metro station
- Owner: Saint Petersburg Metro
- Line: Kirovsko–Vyborgskaya Line
- Platforms: 1 (Island platform)
- Tracks: 2

Construction
- Structure type: Underground
- Depth: 67

History
- Opened: April 22, 1975
- Electrified: Third rail

Services
Preceding station	Saint Petersburg Metro	Following station
Lesnaya towards Devyatkino	Line 1	Ploshchad Lenina towards Prospekt Veteranov
Route map
Location

Vyborgskaya (Russian: Вы́боргская) is a station of the Saint Petersburg Metro. It was opened on 22 April 1975.

In 2022 St Petersburg Metro operator Petersburg Metropoliten signed a 25-year agreement for the lease of 950 metro cars from the Transholdleasing subsidiary of rolling stock manufacturer TMH.
