= Dachnoye (Saint Petersburg Metro) =

Metro station in Saint Petersburg, Russia

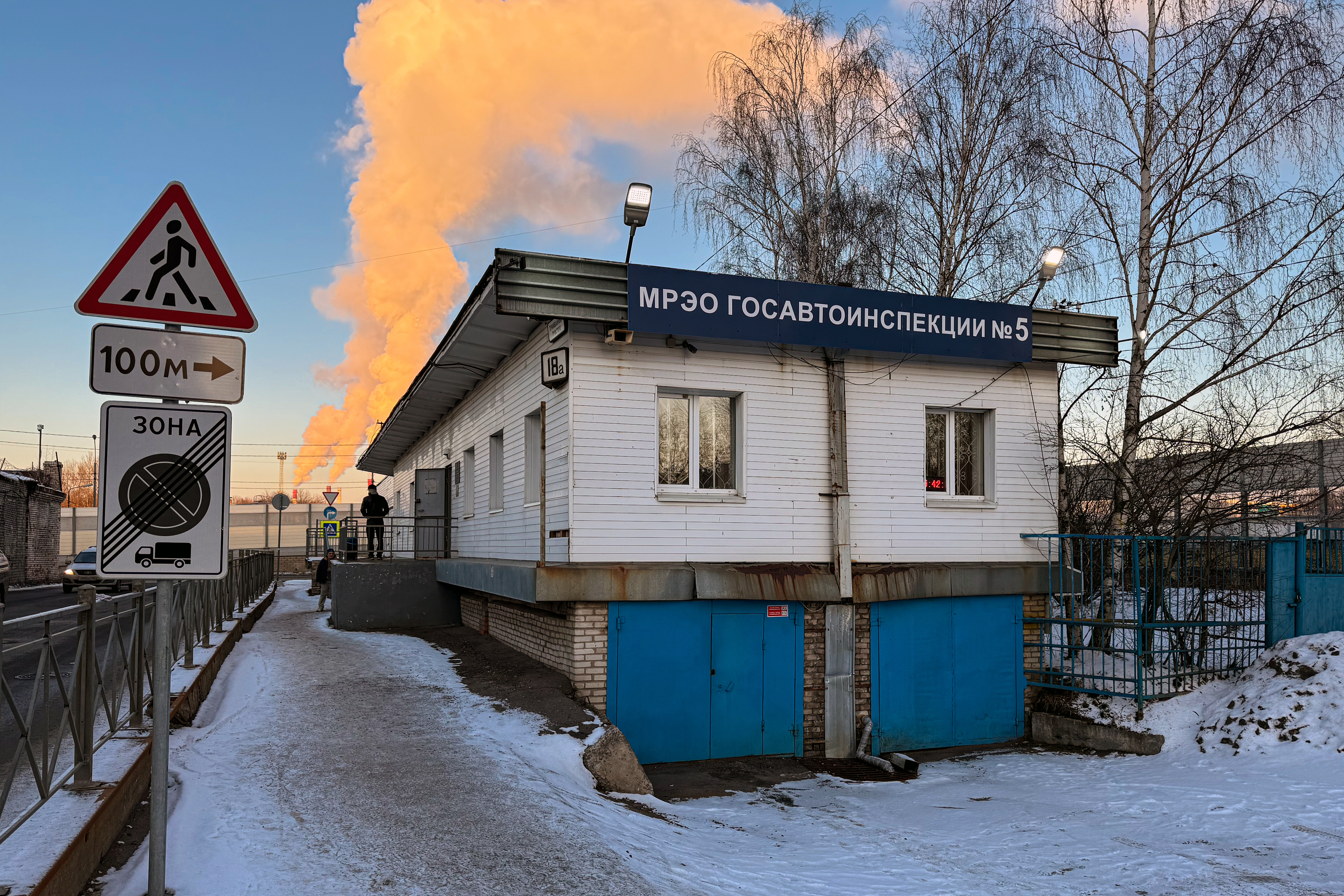

General information
- Coordinates: 59.855361°N 30.270347°E
- System: Temporary station
- Line: Kirovsko–Vyborgskaya Line

Construction
- Structure type: Formerly Elevated

History
- Opened: June 1, 1966
- Closed: October 5, 1977

Services
Preceding station	Saint Petersburg Metro	Following station
Avtovo towards Devyatkino	Line 1 1966–1977	Terminus
Route map
Location

Dachnoye (Russian: Да́чное) was a temporary station on the Kirovsko-Vyborgskaya Line of the Saint Petersburg Metro. It was designed by architect Kseniya Afonskaya and opened on June 1, 1966. The station was created to serve the transportation needs of nearby neighborhoods until the Leninsky Prospekt-Prospekt Veteranov segment could be completed. Dachnoye was an above-ground station, with trains arriving and departing at one end. To save cost the station was constructed in the cheapest manner possible, with platform and the weather covering being made out of precast concrete panels. On 5 October 1977, the Leninskiy Prospect-Prospect Veteranov segment was completed and the station was taken out of service. The rails leading up to it were disassembled and the station itself was enclosed in a larger building that was later converted into local traffic police headquarters.

== Sources ==
- Станция "Дачное" (станция уничтожена) (in Russian)
