= Kirovsky Zavod (Saint Petersburg Metro) =

Saint Petersburg Metro Station

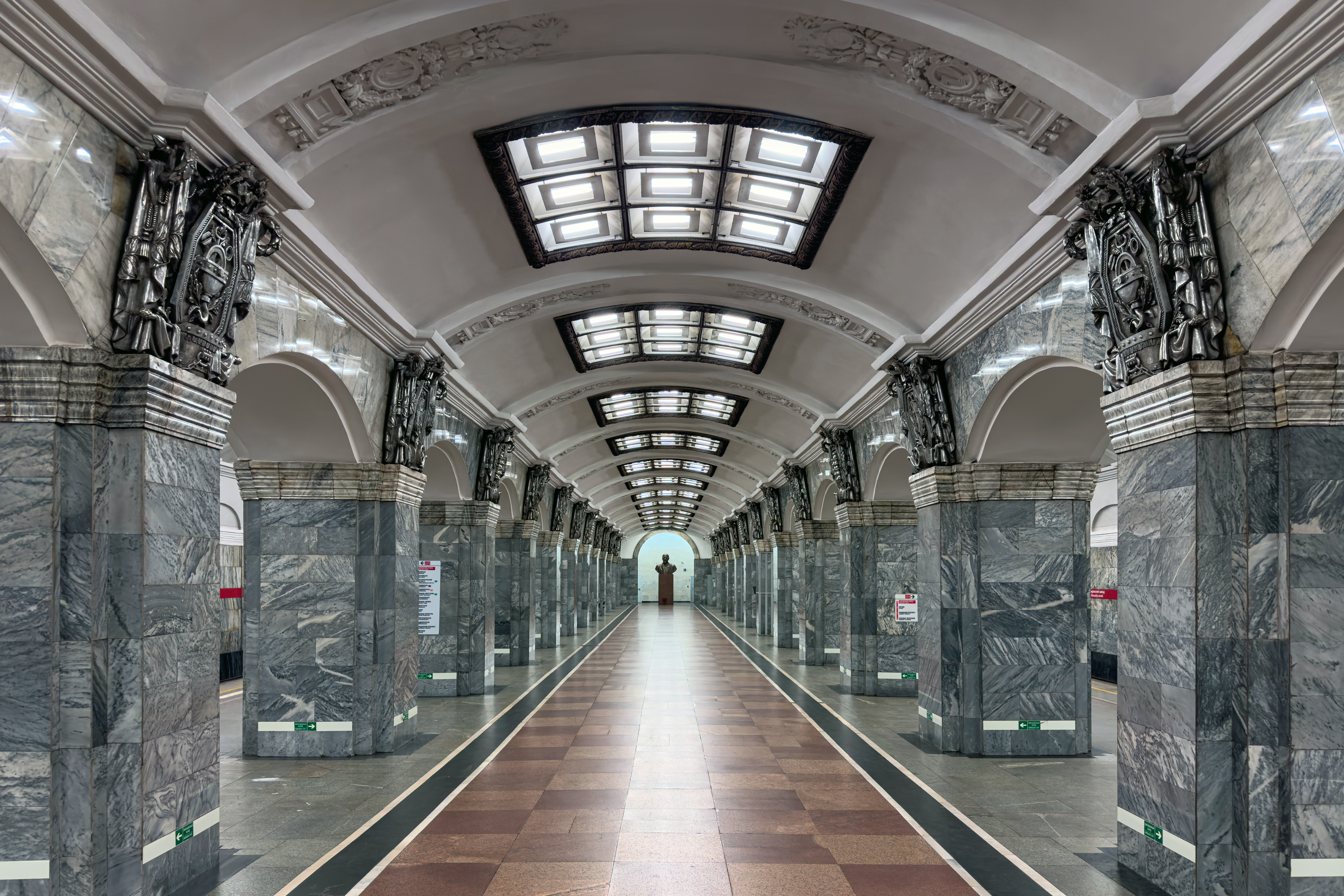
- Station Hall

General information
- Location: Kirovsky District; Saint Petersburg; Russia
- Coordinates: 59°52′46.92″N 30°15′42.88″E
- System: Saint Petersburg Metro station
- Owner: Saint Petersburg Metro
- Line: Kirovsko–Vyborgskaya Line
- Platforms: 1 (Island platform)
- Tracks: 2

Construction
- Structure type: Underground
- Depth: 50 m (164 ft)

History
- Opened: 15 November 1955
- Electrified: Third rail

Services
Preceding station	Saint Petersburg Metro	Following station
Narvskaya towards Devyatkino	Line 1	Avtovo towards Prospekt Veteranov
Terminus	Line 6 transfer at Putilovskaya	Yugo-Zapadnaya Terminus
Route map
Location

Kirovsky Zavod (Russian: Ки́ровский заво́д) (literally Kirov's Factory) is a station of the Saint Petersburg Metro on the Kirovsko-Vyborgskaya Line. It is named after the Kirov Plant which traditionally manufactured armaments. The station opened on 15 November 1955.

A transfer to the Putilovskaya station on the Krasnoselsko-Kalininskaya Line opened on December 26, 2025.
