= Akademicheskaya (Saint Petersburg Metro) =

Saint Petersburg Metro Station

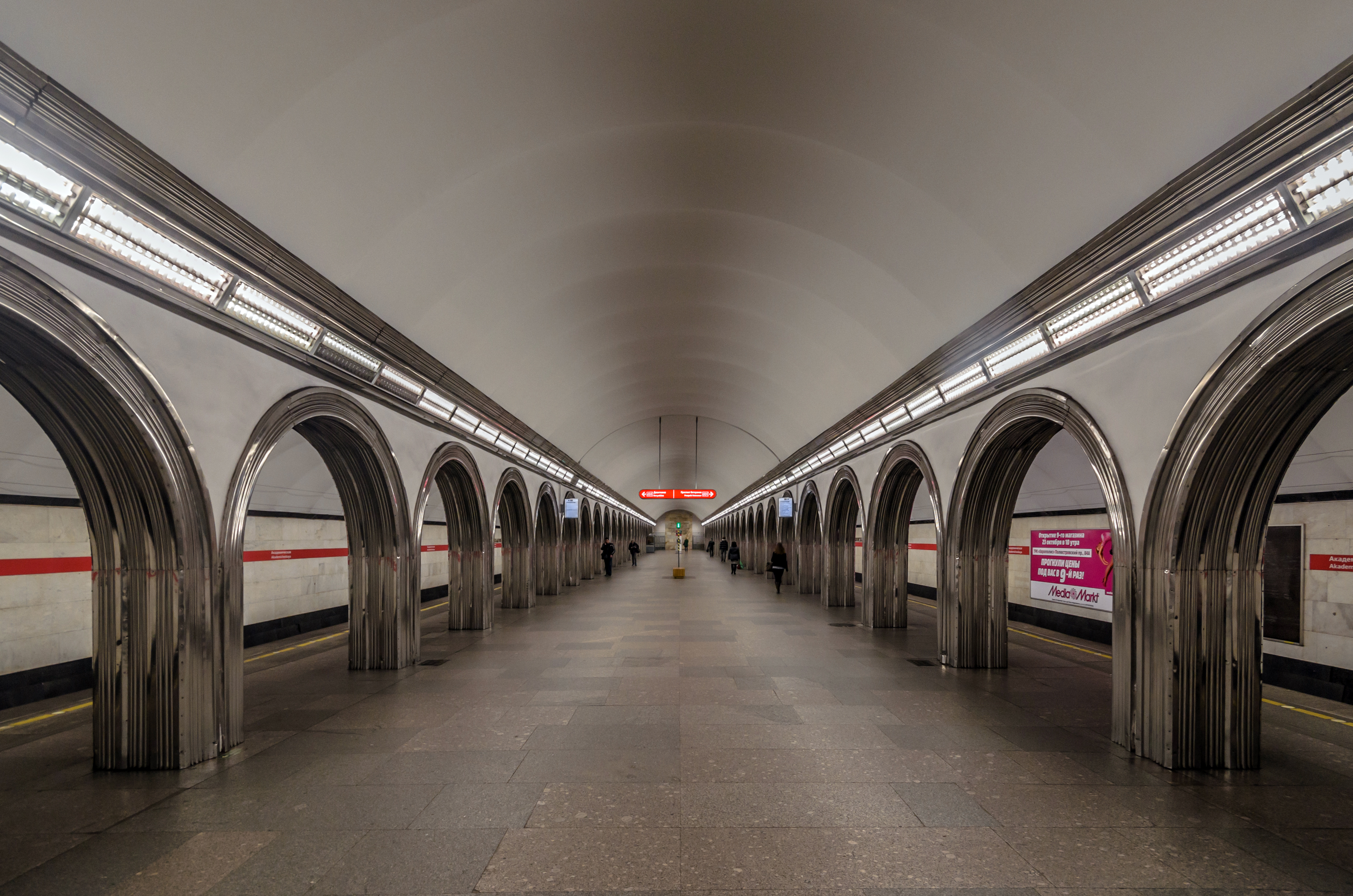
- Platform Hall

General information
- Location: Kalininsky District; Saint Petersburg; Russia
- Coordinates: 60°0′45.97″N 30°23′45.66″E
- System: Saint Petersburg Metro station
- Owner: Saint Petersburg Metro
- Line: Kirovsko–Vyborgskaya Line
- Platforms: 1 (Island platform)
- Tracks: 2
- Connections: Bus: 1МА, 40, 60, 61, 78, 93, 102, 153, 176, 177, 178, 202, 206, 283, 293, 294, 295 Tram: 9, 38, 57 Trolleybus: 6, 21, 31

Construction
- Structure type: Underground
- Depth: 64 m (210 ft)
- Cycle facilities: Yes

Other information
- Station code: АК

History
- Opened: December 31, 1975
- Rebuilt: July 30, 2018 — June 30,2019
- Electrified: 825 v DC by bottom third rail

Services
Preceding station	Saint Petersburg Metro	Following station
Grazhdansky Prospekt towards Devyatkino	Line 1	Politekhnicheskaya towards Prospekt Veteranov
Route map
Location

Akademicheskaya (Russian: Академи́ческая, lit. “Academic”) is a station of the Saint Petersburg Metro. It is located on the Kirovsko-Vyborgskaya line, and opened on December 31, 1975.

The station takes its name from the nearby research institutes; similarly, many streets in the Akademicheskoye Municipal Okrug [ru] were named on the broad principle of honoring science and scientists.

== Surface vestibule ==
The station entrance is located on the corner of Grazhdansky Prospekt and Prospekt Nauki.

The frieze inside the surface vestibule is made of polished red-pink granite; the floor is of gray granite; and the walls of the ticket hall are clad in white marble.

== Underground section ==
Akademicheskaya is a deep-level column station located at a depth of about 64 m. The underground hall is decorated on the theme of Soviet science. On the wall at the end of the hall is an inscription bearing Lenin’s words:

"Now all the wonders of technology and cultural achievements will become public property, and from now on may the human mind and genius never be turned into a means of violence"

(Russian: «Теперь все чудеса техники и завоевания культуры станут общенародным достоянием, и отныне никогда человеческий ум и гений не будут обращены в средства насилия»)

The columns and arches of the platform hall are faced with stamped profiles of polished stainless steel, somewhat resembling Mayakovskaya station in Moscow. The trackside walls are faced with white marble, and the floors are of gray granite. The doors in the trackside walls are covered with small stainless-steel plates arranged in a 3×5 grid. According to the original design, the station was lit above the columns by specially designed lamps with paired daylight tubes without shades, which remained until the 2004 renovation. These fixtures were removed and replaced with conventional standard fluorescent lamps. This change made the station brighter but caused it to lose its original appearance. An escalator tunnel with four escalators is located at the northern end of the station.

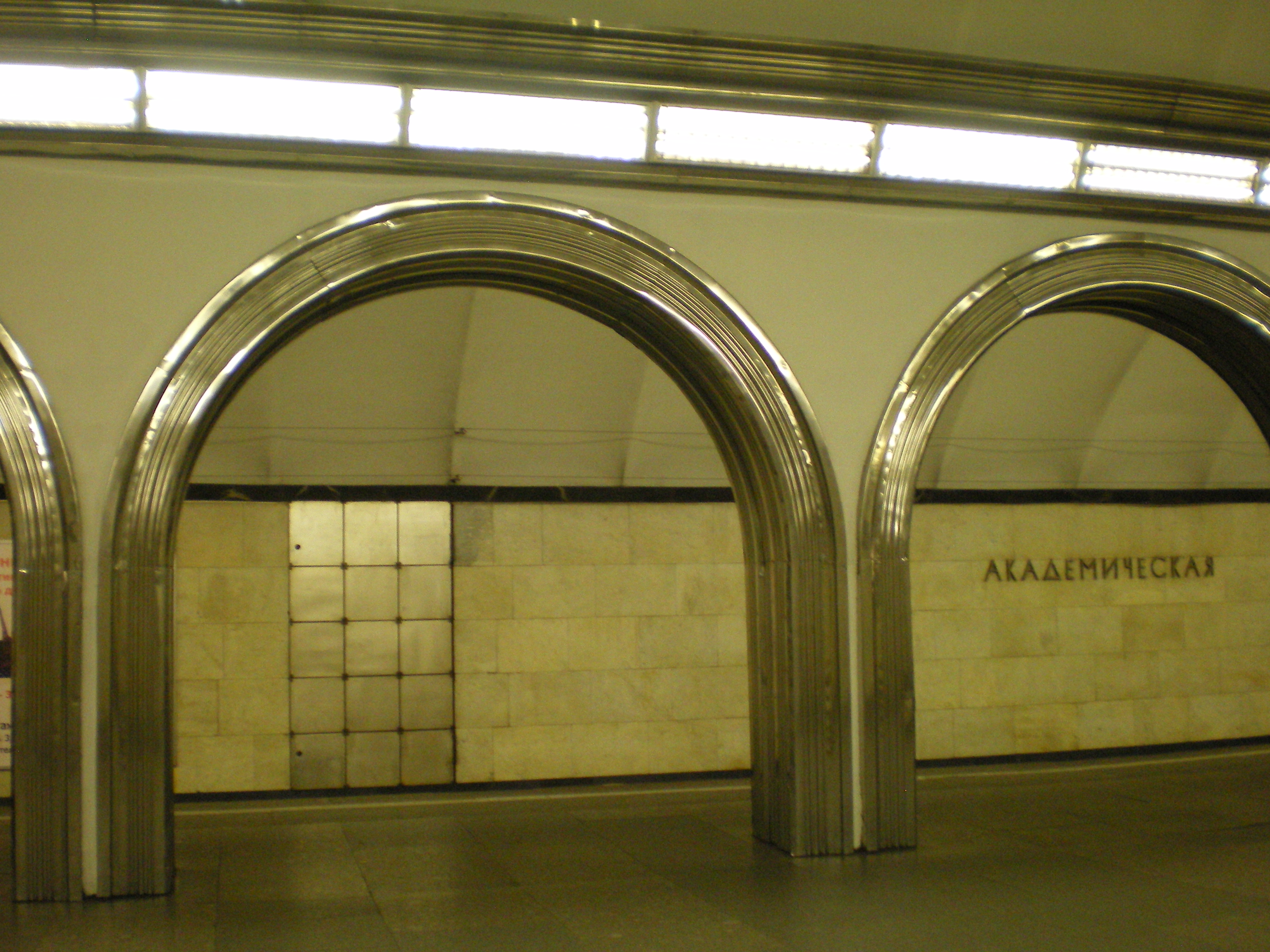

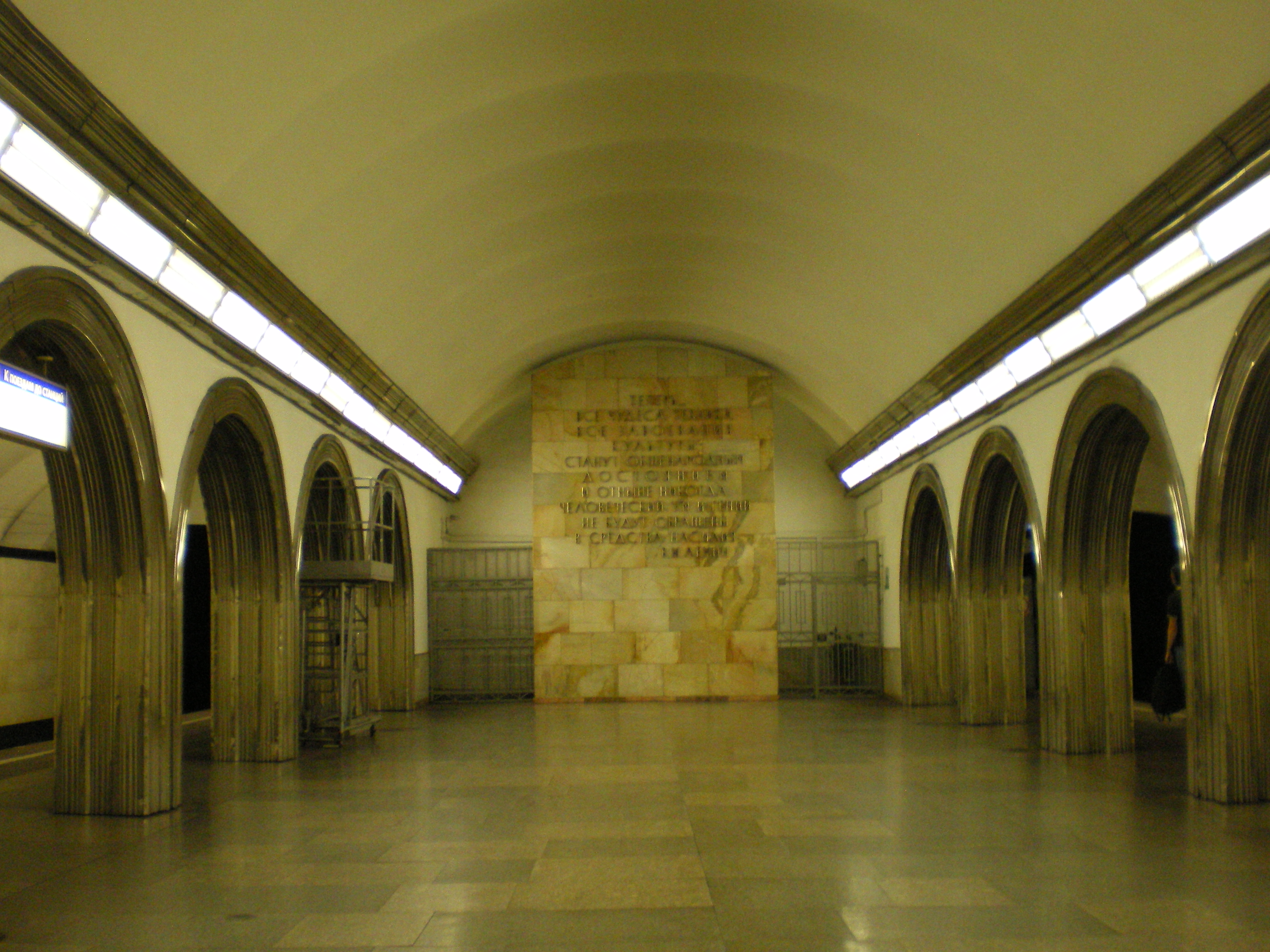

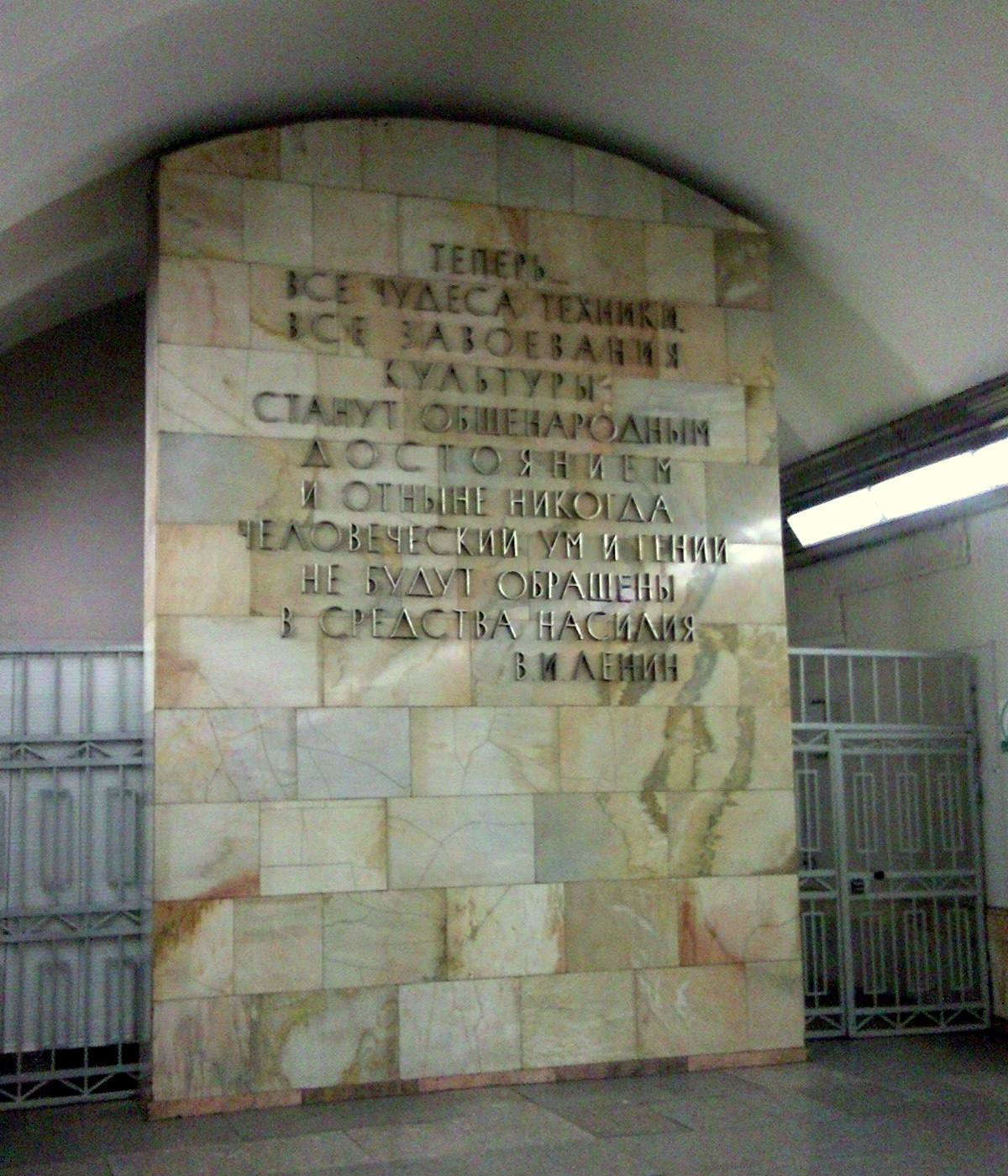

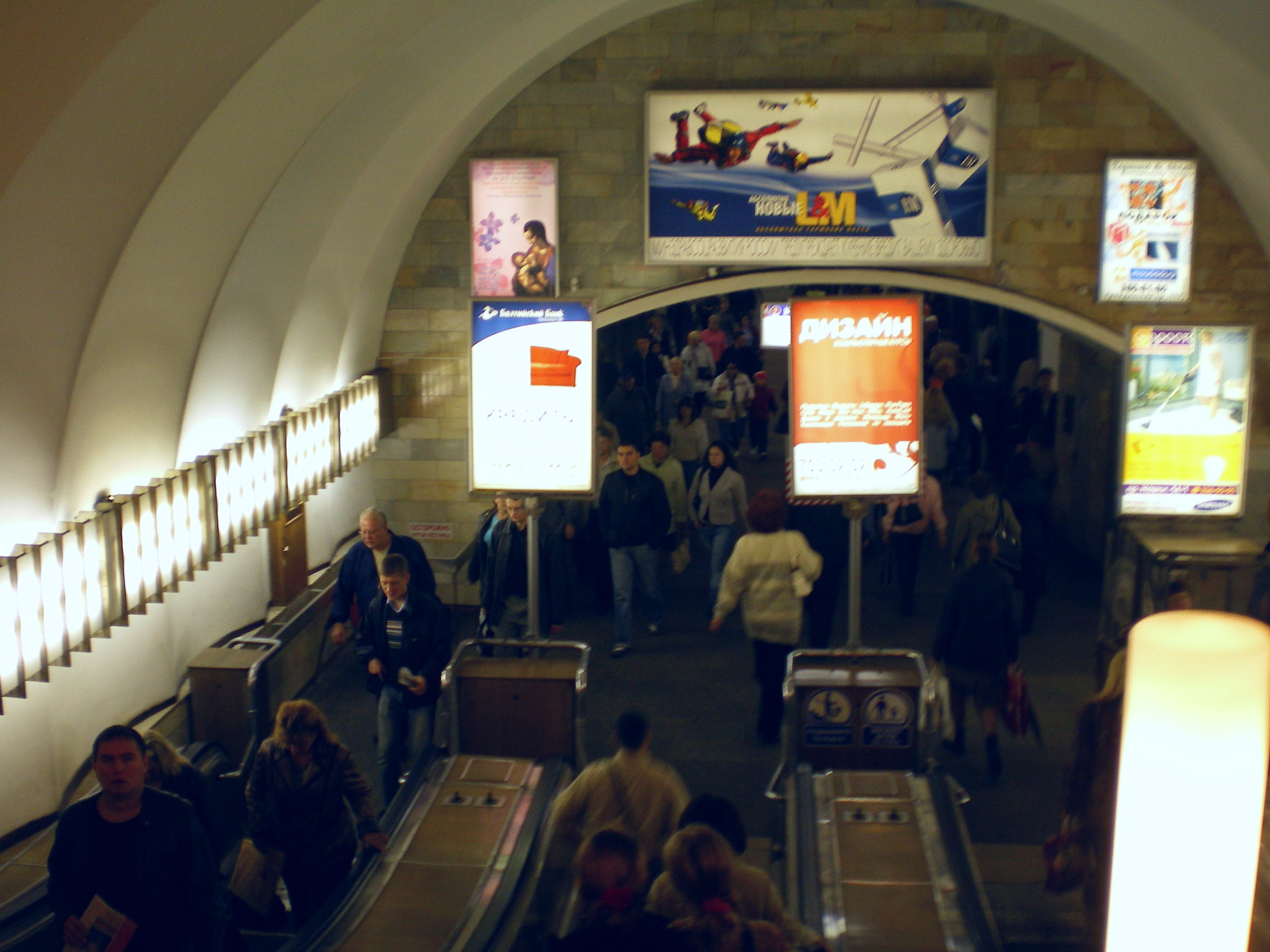

== Renovations ==
In December 2015, the lighting was replaced again, this time with cove lighting. In 2016, the luminaires in the escalator tunne were changed from the “light bollard” type to the “torch” type.

In the lower escalator hall, lamps of the original design were retained, but after a major overhaul in 2018–2019, they were replaced by standard ones.

From July 30, 2018, to July 1, 2019, it was closed for overhaul.
