= Avtovo (Saint Petersburg Metro) =

Saint Petersburg Metro Station

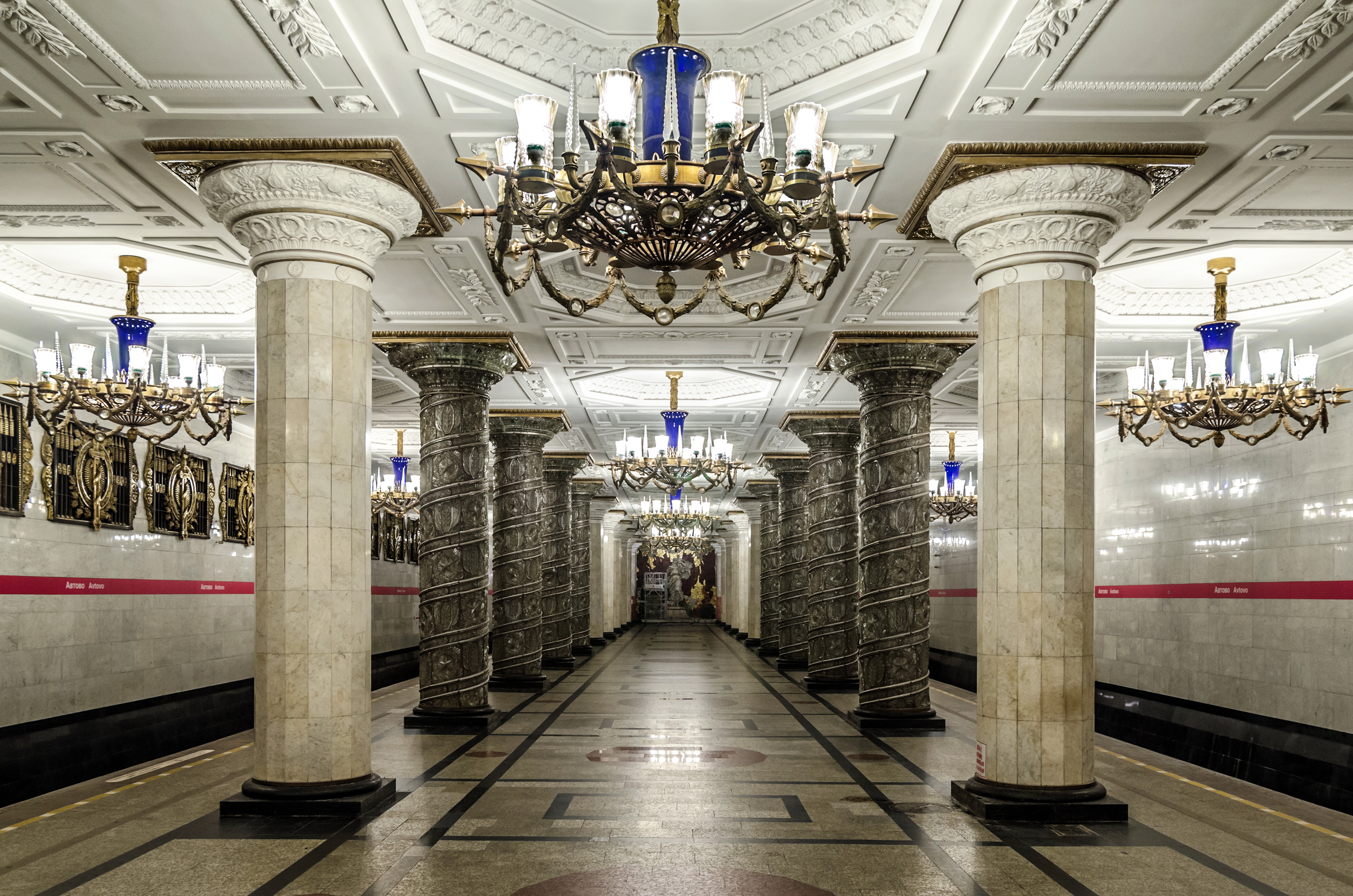
- Station Hall

General information
- Location: Kirovsky District; Saint Petersburg; Russia
- Coordinates: 59°52′02.37″N 30°15′40.87″E
- System: Saint Petersburg Metro station
- Operator: Saint Petersburg Metro
- Line: Kirovsko–Vyborgskaya Line
- Platforms: 1 (Island platform)
- Tracks: 2

Construction
- Structure type: Underground
- Depth: 12 m (39 ft)

History
- Opened: November 15, 1955
- Electrified: Third rail

Services
Preceding station	Saint Petersburg Metro	Following station
Kirovsky Zavod towards Devyatkino	Line 1	Leninsky Prospekt towards Prospekt Veteranov
Former services
Kirovsky Zavod towards Devyatkino	Line 1 1966–1977	Dachnoye Terminus
Location

Avtovo (Russian: А́втово, IPA: [ˈaftəvə]) is a station on the Kirovsko-Vyborgskaya Line of the Saint Petersburg Metro. Designed by architect Yevgenii Levinson, it opened as part of the first Leningrad Metro line on November 15, 1955. In 2014, The Guardian included it on the list of 12 most beautiful metro stations in the world.

Avtovo's unique and highly ornate design features columns faced with ornamental glass manufactured at the Lomonosov factory. Although the original plan envisaged using glass on all of the columns in the station, white marble was substituted on some due to time constraints. This marble was supposed to be temporary but has never been replaced. The walls are faced with white marble and adorned on the north side by a row of ornamental ventilation grilles. At the end of the platform, a mosaic by V.A. Voronetskiy and A.K. Sokolov commemorates the Leningrad Blockade (1941–1944) during the Second World War.

In 2012 there was finished the 9-years long restoration of the subway station “Avtovo” after which it acquired its initial look of 1955.

Unlike the other stations on the first line, Avtovo is a shallow-level station constructed using the cut and cover method. It belongs to the shallow column class of underground stations.

Avtovo has as its entrance vestibule a large Neoclassical building with a domed cupola, located on the east side of Prospekt Stachek.

== Gallery ==
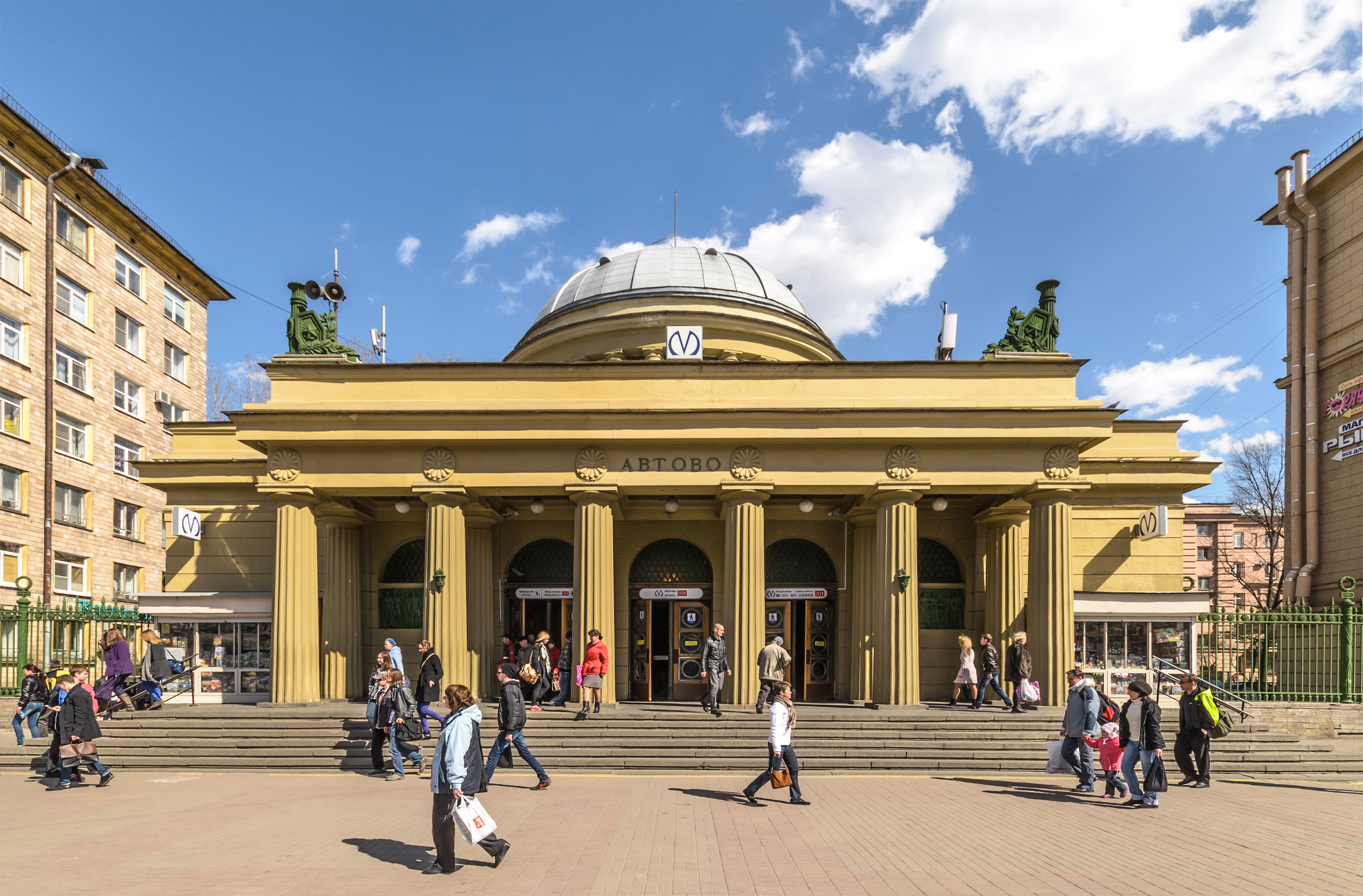
Avtovo entrance vestibule
