= Ploshchad Lenina (Saint Petersburg Metro) =

Saint Petersburg Metro Station

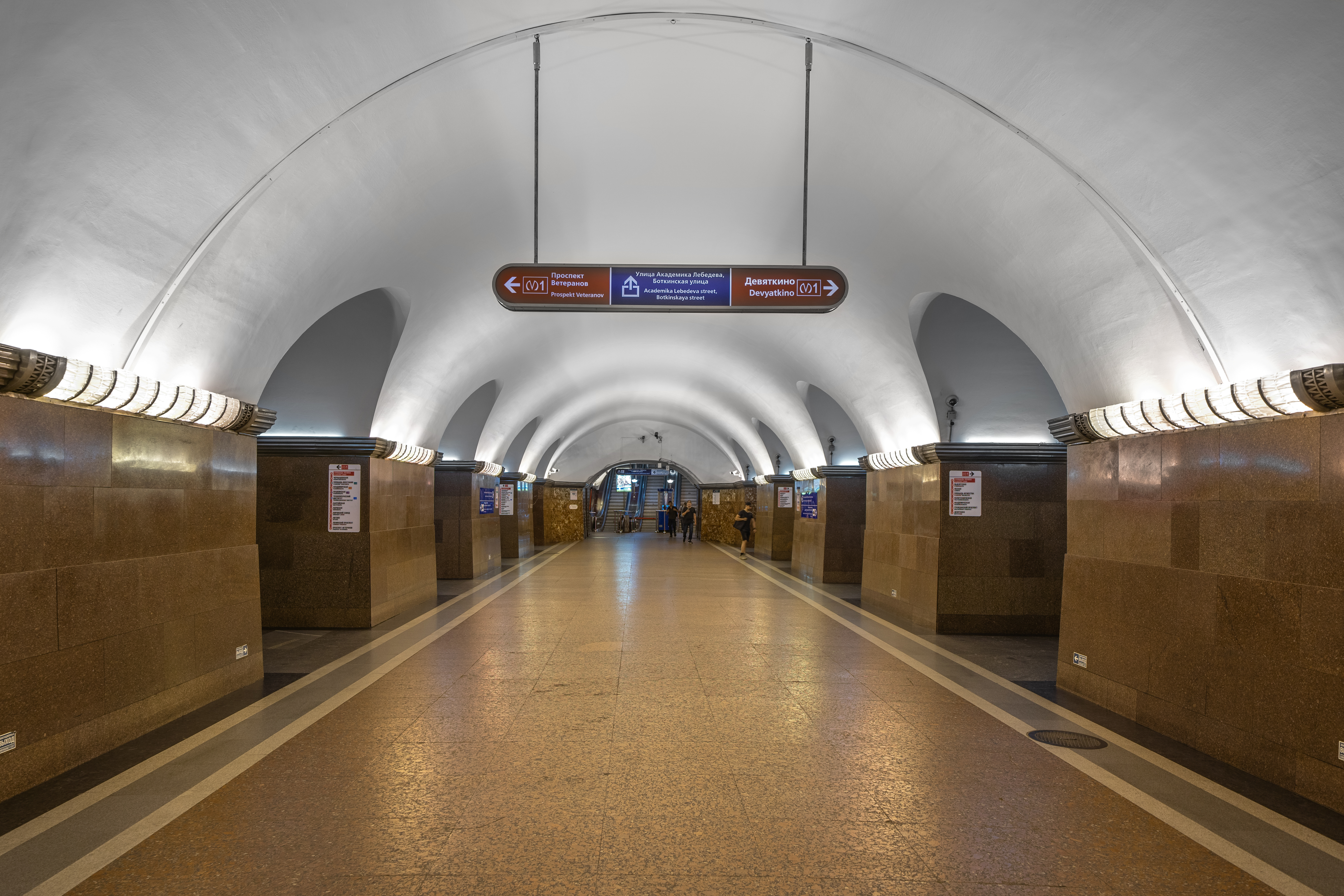
- Platform Hall

General information
- Location: Kalininsky District; Saint Petersburg; Russia
- Coordinates: 59°57′24″N 30°21′20″E
- System: Saint Petersburg Metro station
- Operator: Saint Petersburg Metro
- Line: Kirovsko–Vyborgskaya Line
- Platforms: 1 (Island platform)
- Tracks: 2
- Connections: Finlyandsky Rail Terminal Bus: 21, 28, 37, 49, 86, 106, 107, 133, 176, 234, 267, 530 Tram: 3, 6, 20, 23 Trolleybus: 3, 8, 38, 43

Construction
- Structure type: Underground
- Depth: 70 m (230 ft)

Other information
- Station code: ЛН

History
- Opened: June 1, 1958
- Electrified: Third rail

Services
Preceding station	Saint Petersburg Metro	Following station
Vyborgskaya towards Devyatkino	Line 1	Chernyshevskaya towards Prospekt Veteranov
Location

Ploshchad Lenina (Russian: Пло́щадь Ле́нина, lit. “Lenin Square“) is a station on the Kirovsko-Vyborgskaya Line of the Saint Petersburg Metro, located between Chernyshevskaya and Vyborgskaya.

The station was opened on June 1, 1958, as part of the second stage of the metro (Ploshchad Vosstaniya–Ploshchad Lenina).

It was named after Lenin Square [ru], the location of its main surface vestibule.

== Surface vestibules ==
The surface vestibule was built directly into the Finlyandsky Railway Station building. The wall of the entrance hall is decorated with a panoramic mosaic that commemorates Lenin's speech before the workers and soldiers of Petrograd on April 16, 1917. It was created by artists A.A. Mylnikov and A.L. Korolyov.

In 1962 the second vestibule from Botkinskaya Street was completed. Both entrances are served by three escalators. At the time of opening, these were the tallest escalators in the world (lifting height of 65.8 m, incline length of 131.6 m).

== Underground section ==
Ploshchad Lenina is a deep underground pylon station at approximately 70 meters in depth, making it one of the deepest in the Saint Petersburg Metro.

The station's theme commemorates Lenin's return from exile to Petrograd in April 1917.

Built during the transition from Stalinist architectural excesses to early Soviet modernism, the station's design is characterized by laconicism, minimalism, and an airy feel.

The sense of spaciousness is emphasized by the enlarged diameter of the tunnels (9.5 m, compared to 8.5 m at Chernyshevskaya), which was necessary to accommodate the massive passenger flow from the nearby railway terminal.

The station uses contrasting red and white tones in its color scheme. The pylons are faced with marble. On the doors of the track walls are decorative grilles with the inscription "1958," the year the station was opened. Notably, the ceramic tiles on the track walls are laid in a "brickwork" pattern — the only such example in the Saint Petersburg Metro.

In 2006, the lighting of the station was redone, with mercury lamps replaced by sodium lamps. While the station gained a brighter look, its original color palette was entirely changed. Since 2021, the station has been illuminated by white LED lamps.

== See also ==
- Ploshchad Lenina (Minsk Metro)
- Ploshchad Lenina (Novosibirsk Metro)
