= Grazhdansky Prospekt (Saint Petersburg Metro) =

Metro station in Saint Petersburg, Russia

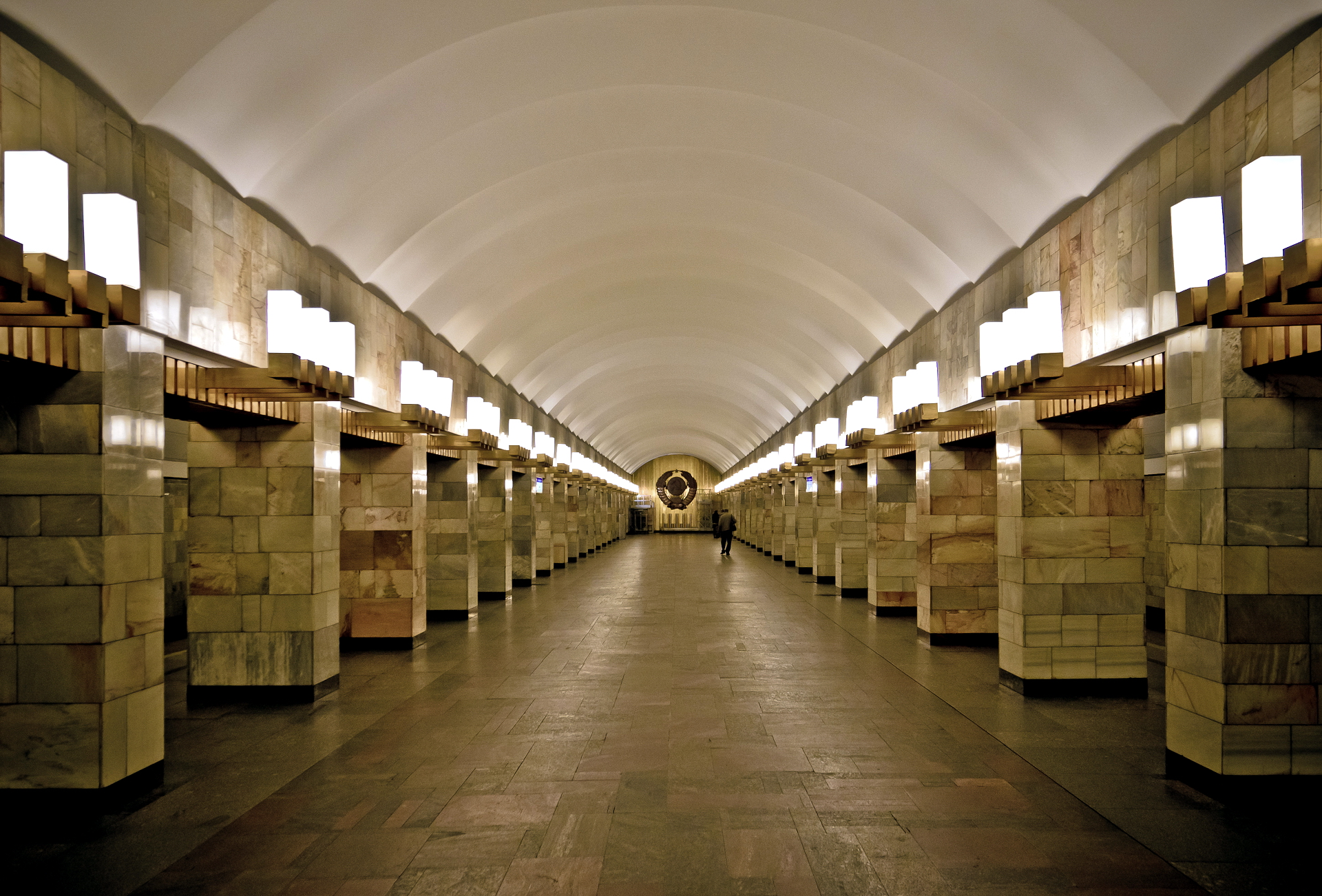
- Platform Hall

General information
- Location: Kalininsky District; Saint Petersburg; Russia
- Coordinates: 60.035197°N 30.418452°E
- System: Saint Petersburg Metro station
- Operator: Saint Petersburg Metro
- Line: Kirovsko–Vyborgskaya Line
- Platforms: 1 (Island platform)
- Tracks: 2
- Connections: Bus: 60, 93, 121, 139, 176, 177, 193, 199, 208, 240, 247, 295 Tram: 51, 100 Trolleybus: 6, 21, 38 Suburban bus : 205, 809П, 827, 885А

Construction
- Structure type: Underground
- Depth: 64 m (210 ft)
- Platform levels: 1
- Parking: Yes
- Cycle facilities: Yes

History
- Opened: December 29, 1978
- Electrified: 825 V DC

Services
Preceding station	Saint Petersburg Metro	Following station
Devyatkino Terminus	Line 1	Akademicheskaya towards Prospekt Veteranov
Location

Grazhdansky Prospekt (Russian: Гражда́нский проспе́кт) is a station of the Saint Petersburg Metro. It is on the Kirovsko-Vyborgskaya Line and opened on December 29, 1978.

The station is located at the southwestern corner of the intersection of Grazhdansky Prospekt and Prospekt Prosveshcheniya.

== Name ==
The station takes its name from the avenue [ru] on which it is located.

While the name echoes the Russian word “grazhdansky” (“civil”, “civic”), it derives from the historical area of Grazhdanka [ru] and was not coined artificially, unlike many streets in the area that were named to glorify science and culture. Perhaps because of this consonance, the main theme of the station’s decoration is national unity and friendship among peoples.

== Decoration ==
The interior is finished in light, warm yellow tones, giving it a festive appearance; its central artistic element is a large silver coat of arms of the Soviet Union, almost three metres in diameter, on the end grille.
