= Baltiysky railway station =

Railway station in Russia

St. Petersburg–Baltiysky Санкт-Петербург–Балтийский
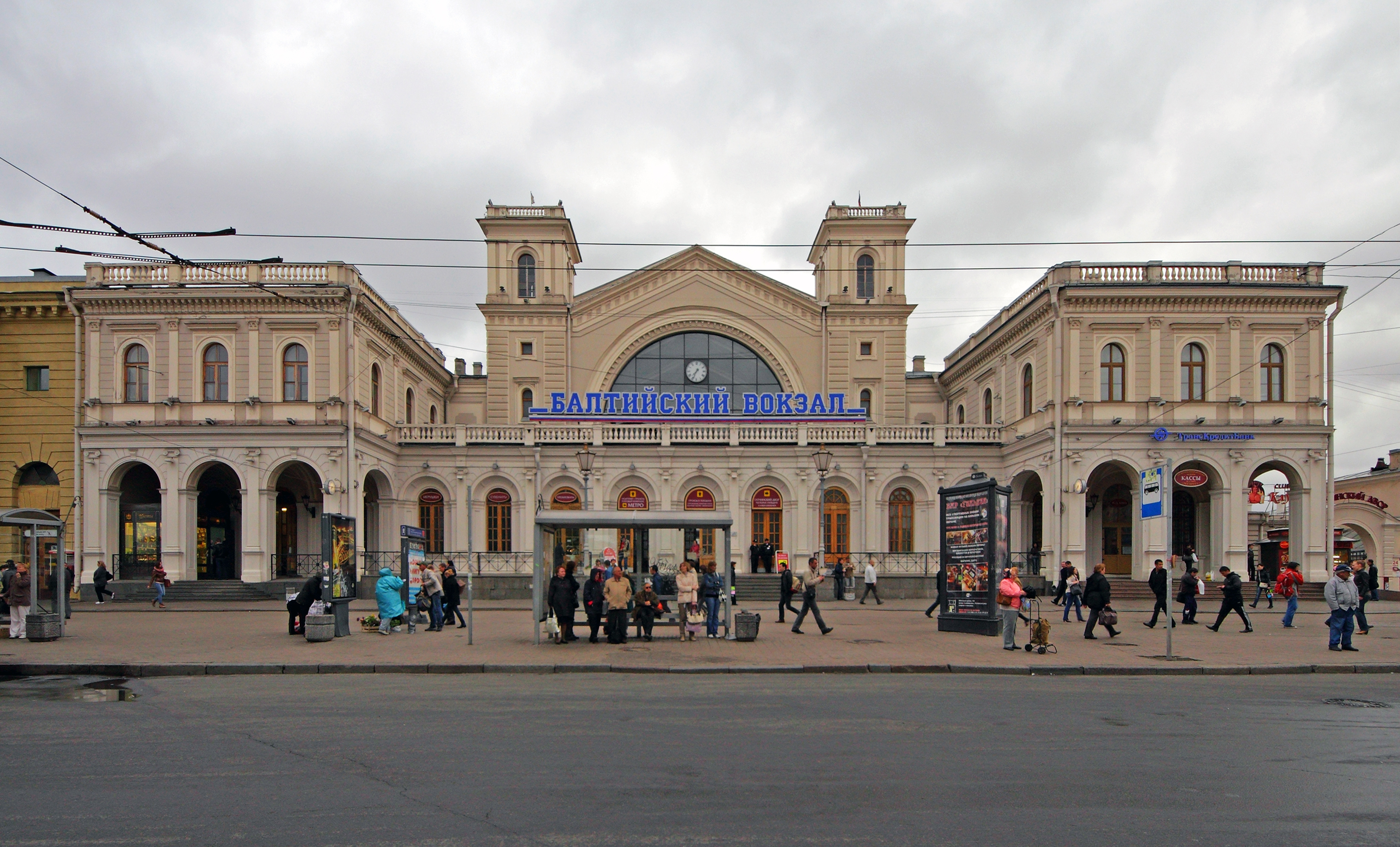
- Station entrance

General information
- Location: 120, Naberezhnaya Obvodnogo kanala, St. Petersburg, Russia
- Coordinates: 59.9071°N 30.2988°E
- Platforms: 5
- Tracks: 7
- Connections: Saint Petersburg Metro station: Baltiyskaya

Construction
- Structure type: at-grade
- Parking: no

Other information
- Station code: 036002
- Fare zone: 0

History
- Opened: 1857
- Former names: Peterhofsky
Location

St. Petersburg–Baltiysky (Russian: Балти́йский вокза́л) is a railway station in St. Petersburg, one of the busiest railway stations in Russia by volume of suburban traffic.

The station was modelled by architect Alexander Krakau after Gare de l'Est in Paris. Construction started in 1854. The station was opened on 21 July 1857 as the Peterhof railway station.

== Overview ==
The station retains a glass roof over the terminal platforms and is flanked by two-storey wings. The left one used to be reserved for members of the Russian royalty who went to their palaces in Strelna, Peterhof, Oranienbaum. A glass panel on the façade still features the original clock, designed by Pavel Bure, a celebrated watchmaker to the tsar and the ice-hockey player’s ancestor.

In 1872, after the railway line was extended to Reval (Tallinn), the Peterhof railway station was renamed to its present form. In 1931–32, the station was reconstructed. A nearby vestibule of the Baltiyskaya Metro Station was opened in 1955. Since 1933, the station has been used to handle suburban trains only.

In 2009, the DT1 multiple unit hybrid train departed for its inaugural trip from this station.

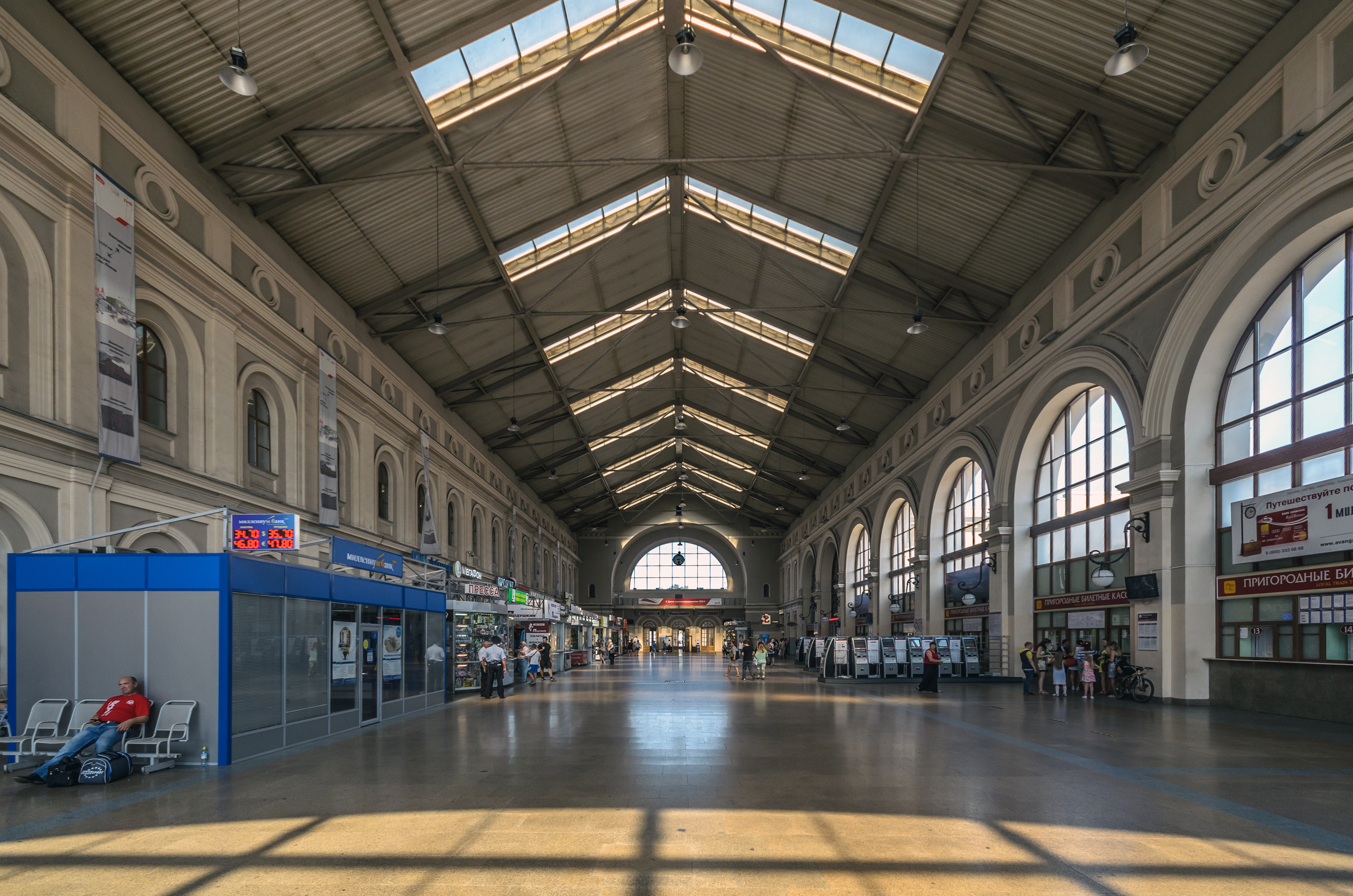
The station's ticket and waiting hall

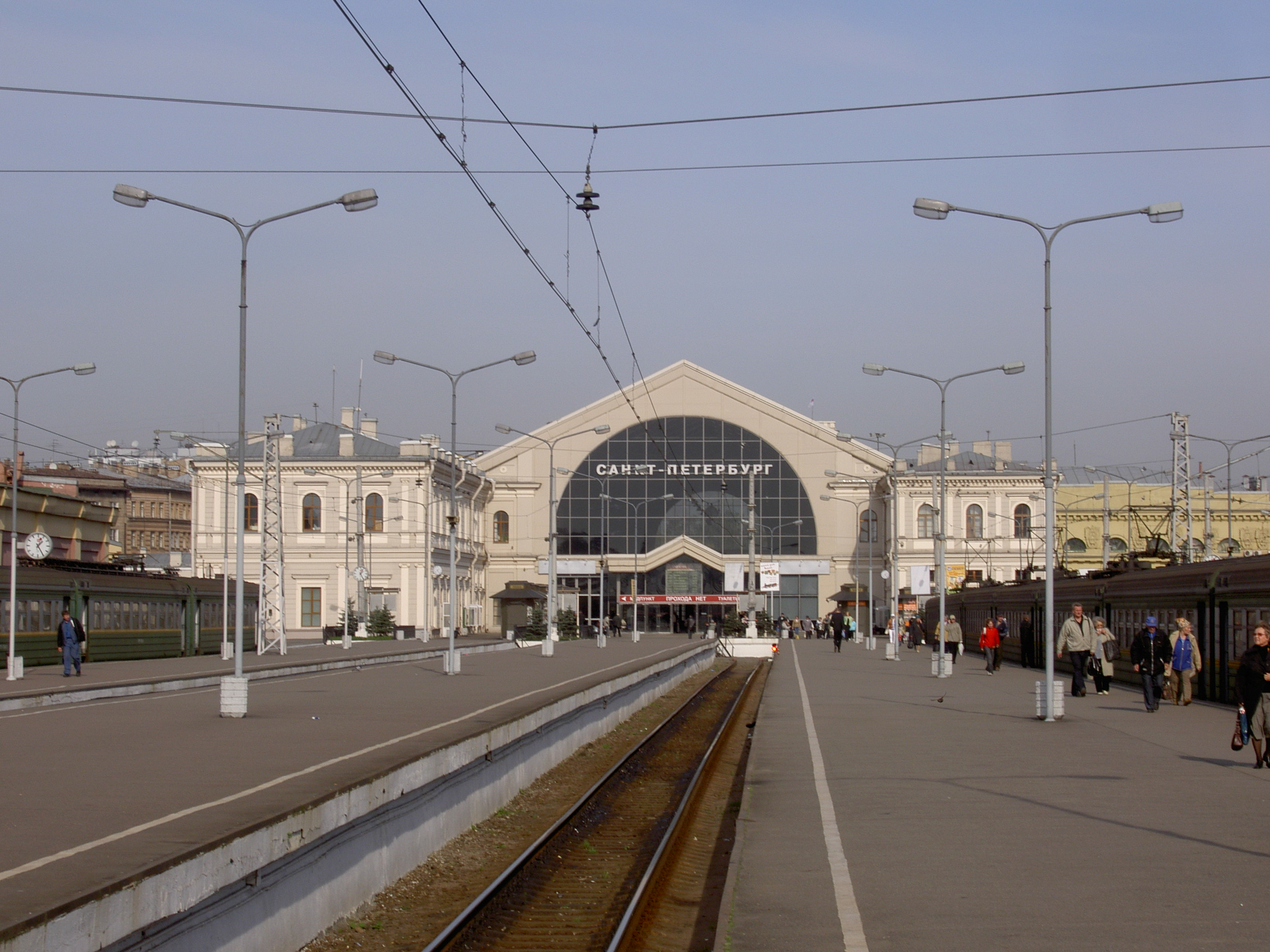
Platforms at the Baltiysky station

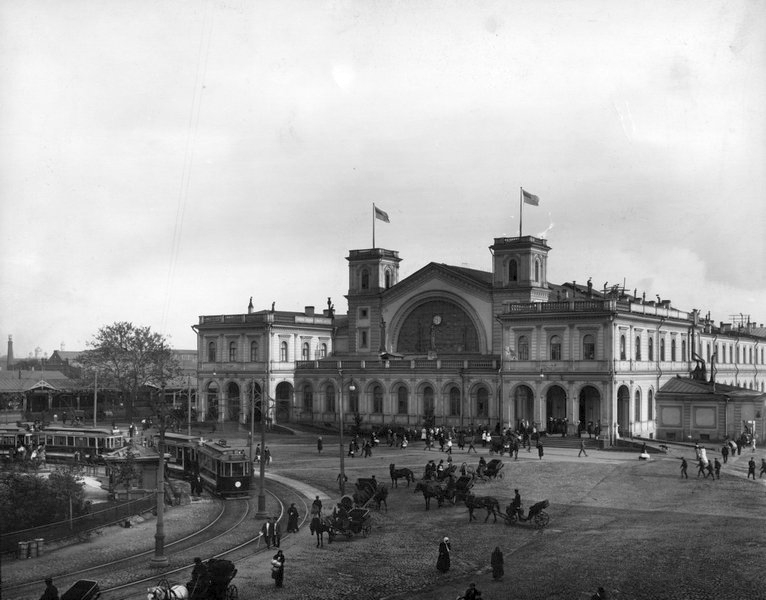
Station in 1909
