= Line 1 (Saint Petersburg Metro) =

Line 1 (Kirovsko-Vyborgskaya)

Overview
- Status: Operational
- Owner: Saint Petersburg Metro
- Termini: Devyatkino; Prospekt Veteranov
- Stations: 19

Service
- Type: Rapid transit
- System: Saint Petersburg Metro

History
- Opened: 15 November 1955; 70 years ago
- Last extension: 1978

Technical
- Line length: 29.57 km (18.4 mi)
- Track gauge: 1,524 mm (5 ft)

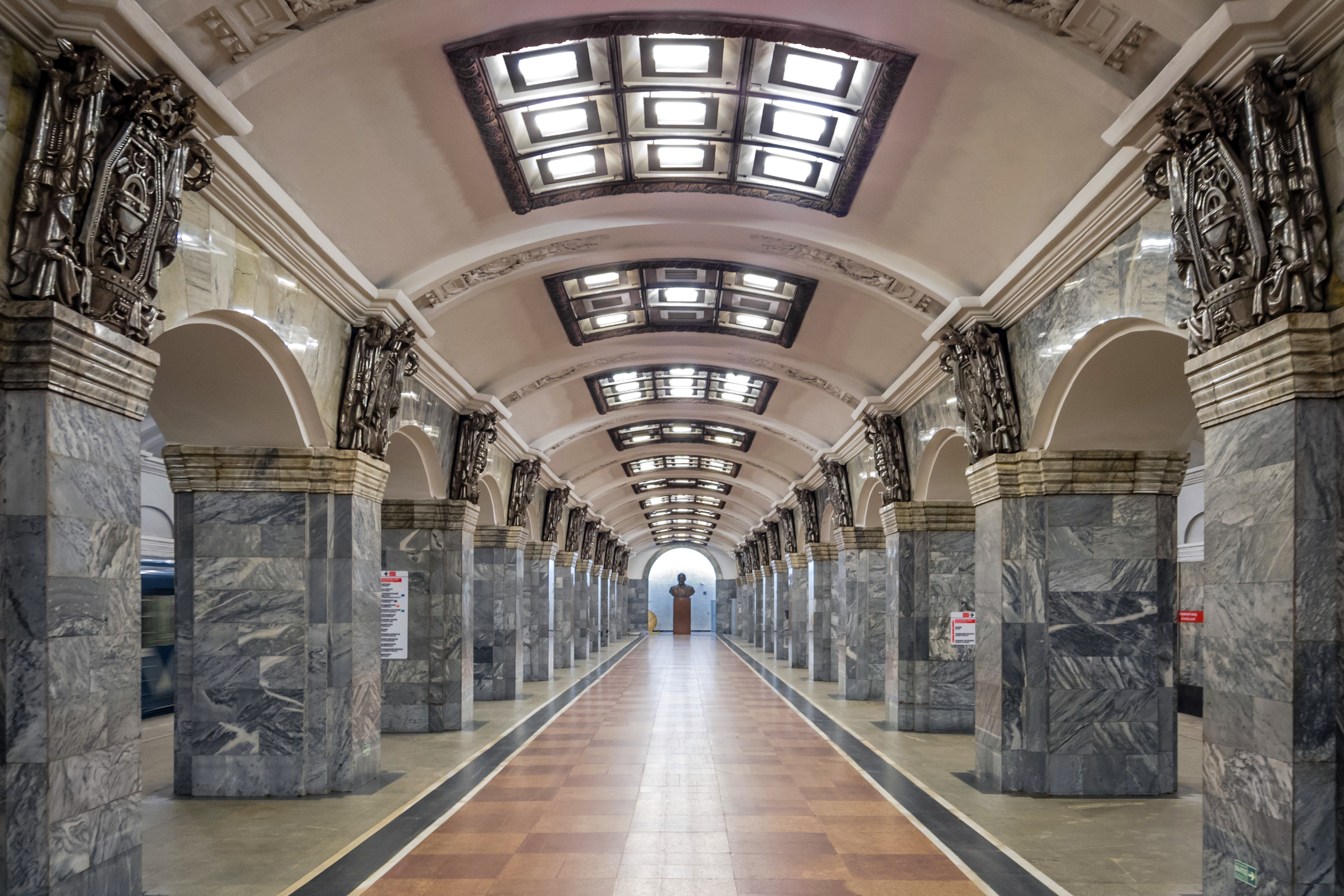
Kirovsky Zavod station

Line 1 of the Saint Petersburg Metro, also known as Kirovsko-Vyborgskaya Line (Russian: Ки́ровско-Вы́боргская ли́ния) or Red Line, is the oldest rapid transit line in Saint Petersburg, Russia, opened in 1955, which connects Kirovsky and Vyborgsky districts of the city. The original stations are very beautiful and elaborately decorated, especially Avtovo and Narvskaya. The line connects four out of five Saint Petersburg's main railway stations. In 1995, a flooding occurred in a tunnel between Lesnaya and Ploschad Muzhestva stations and, for nine years, the line was separated into two independent segments (the gap was connected by a shuttle bus route). The line is also one of the two lines in the network to feature shallow stations, the other being the Nevsko-Vasileostrovskaya Line.

The line cuts Saint Petersburg centre on a northeast-southwest axis. In the south its alignment follows the shore of the Gulf of Finland. In the north it extends outside the city limits into the Leningrad oblast (it is the only line to stretch beyond the city boundary). The Kirovsko-Vyborgskaya Line is generally coloured red on Metro maps, and markup of this colour has been added to its stations for ease of passenger orientation; the new generation trains of Yubileyniy carriages since 2010s also have their outside colour matching the colour of the line.

== Timeline ==
Segment	Date opened	Length
Ploshchad Vosstaniya to Avtovo	November 15, 1955	9.4 km
Pushkinskaya	April 30, 1956	N/A
Ploshchad Vosstaniya to Ploshchad Lenina	June 1, 1958	3.0 km
Avtovo to Dachnoye (temporary)	June 1, 1966	1.5 km
Ploshchad Lenina to Akademicheskaya	April 22, 1975	8.8 km
Politekhnicheskaya	December 29, 1975	N/A
Avtovo to Prospekt Veteranov	October 5, 1977	3.5 - 1.5 km*
Akademicheskaya to Devyatkino	December 29, 1978	4.9 km
Total:	19 Stations	29.6 km

* Upon the 1977 extension, the temporary station Dachnoye (which had been the terminus since 1966) and its tracks were demolished.

== Name changes ==
Station	Previous name(s)	Years
Devyatkino	Komsomolskaya	1978–1991

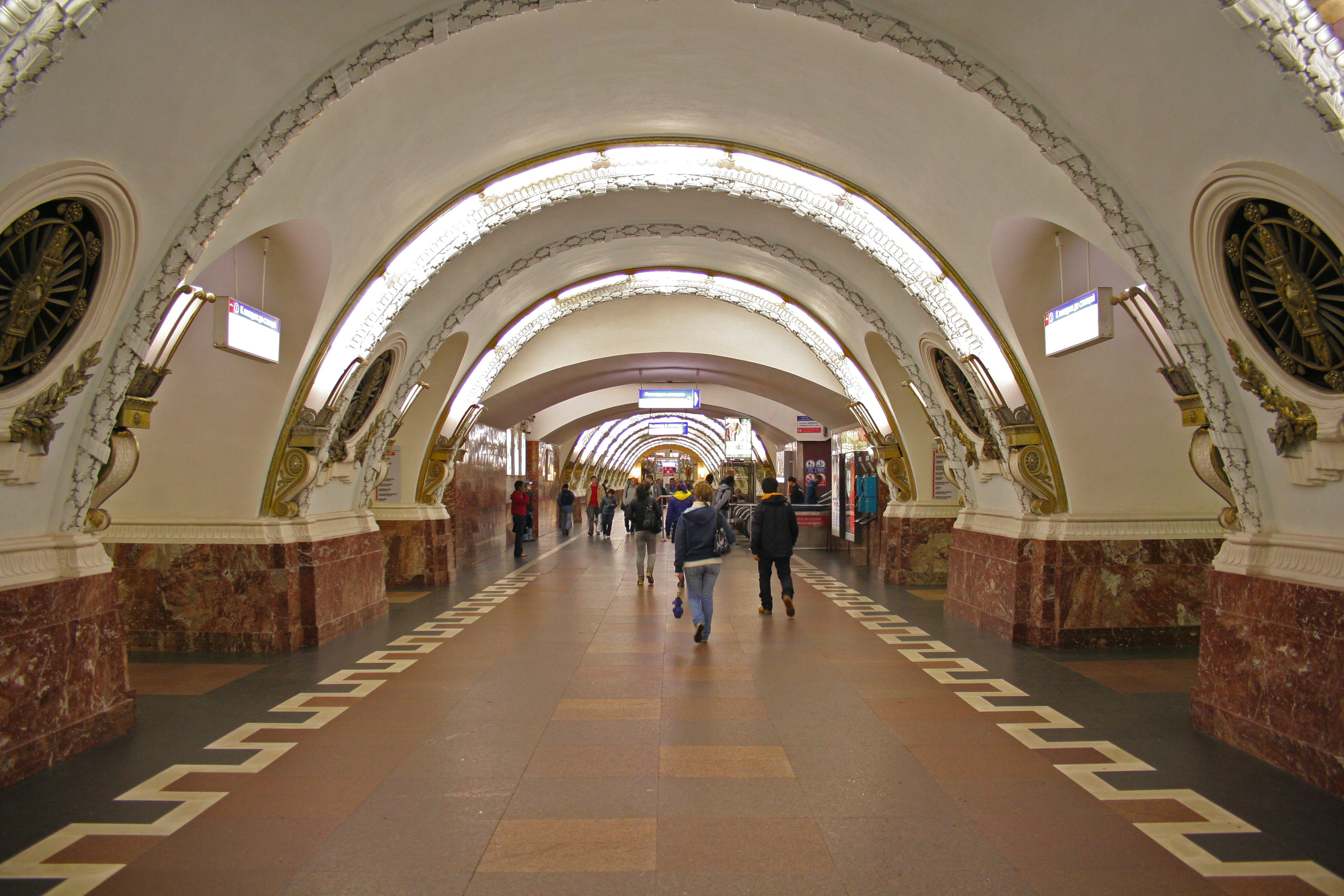
Ploshchad Vosstaniya station

== Transfers ==
Transfer to	At
Line 2 (Saint Petersburg Metro)	Tekhnologichesky Institut
Line 3 (Saint Petersburg Metro)	Ploshchad Vosstaniya
Line 4 (Saint Petersburg Metro)	Vladimirskaya
Line 5 (Saint Petersburg Metro)	Pushkinskaya
Line 6 (Saint Petersburg Metro)	Kirovsky Zavod

The transfer on Tekhnologichesky Institut is a cross-platform one. Last transfer to the Krasnoselsko-Kalininskaya Line has opened via Kirovsky Zavod in 2025.

== Rolling stock ==
Two depots serve the line, Avtovo (№ 1) and Severnoe (№ 4), although when the lines separated in 1995 the Severnoe served the northern section whilst the Avtovo, along with other depots took over the southern section. As there was a large surplus in the north, conventional railway was used to transfer many of the trains to other depots. Upon the reunification of the two sections, the Severnoe depot's park was restored and the line became the first to start using eight-carriage trains, of which currently 34 and 20 trains are assigned respectively to the metro. Most of them are E, Em, Ema, and Emx trains built in the 1960s and 1970s.

== Recent developments and future plans ==
Given the age of most of the stations on this line, constant renovations take place to restore them. The Vladimirskaya and Narvskaya stations closed for reconstruction from autumn 2006 until 2008. Debate continues over whether to open the controversial mosaic of Stalin (located on Narvskaya station behind the service room) to the public. As of 2016 discussions have begun on extending the line southward.

== Links ==
- Saint Petersburg Metro official website
