= Devyatkino (Saint Petersburg Metro) =

Saint Petersburg Metro Station

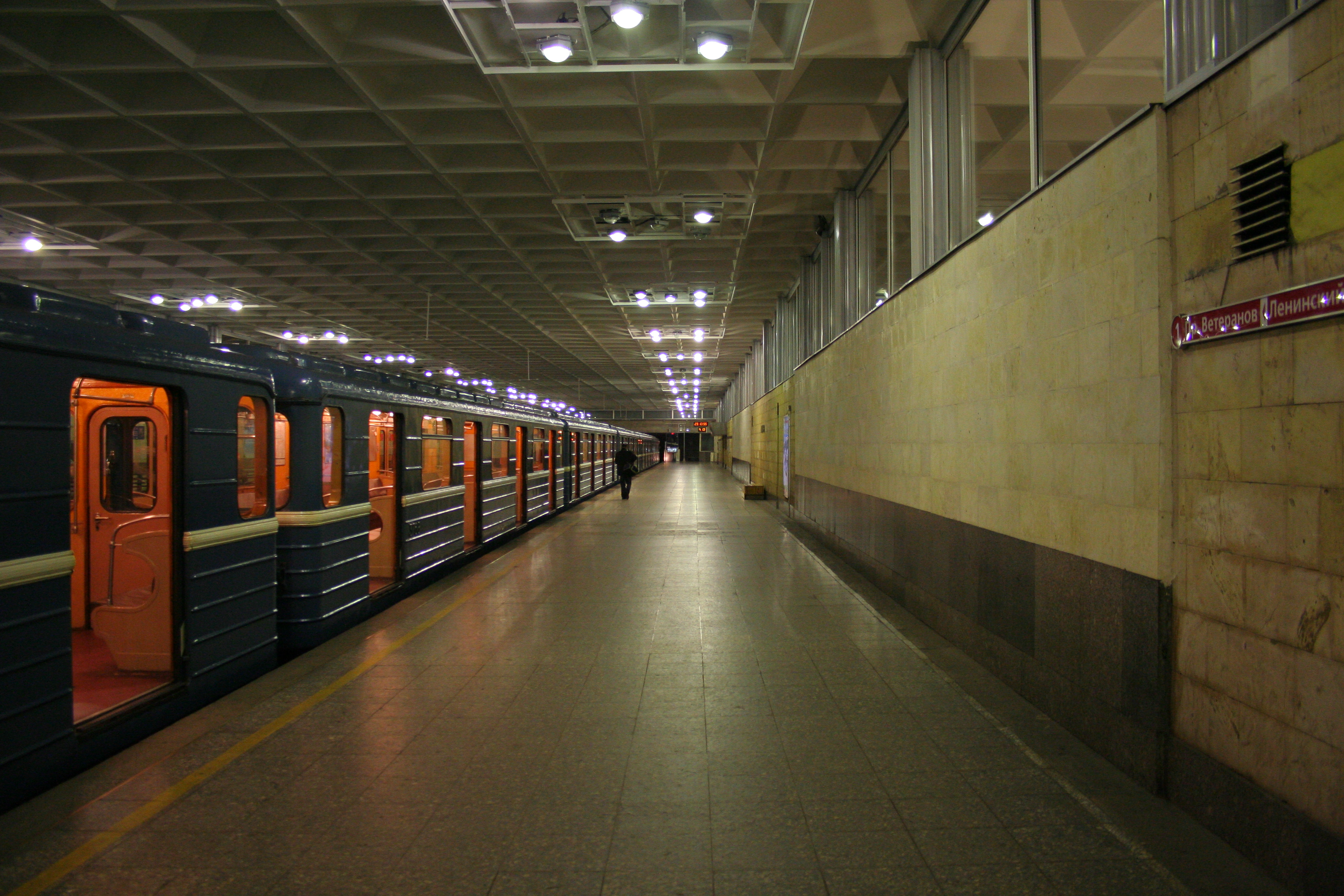
- Station platforms

General information
- Location: Vsevolozhsky District; Leningrad Oblast; Russia
- Coordinates: 60.050256°N 30.442219°E
- System: Saint Petersburg Metro station
- Operator: Saint Petersburg Metro
- Line: Kirovsko–Vyborgskaya Line
- Platforms: 2 (Side platforms)
- Tracks: 2
- Bus routes: Bus: 124 Suburban bus: 1, 2, 3, 4, 5, 562, 563, 619, 622, 625, 627, 667, 668, 668а, 670, 679, 885а Commercial bus: 809п, 885
- Connections: Devyatkino Railway Station

Construction
- Structure type: Aboveground
- Depth: 0 m (0 ft)
- Cycle facilities: No

Other information
- Station code: ДВ

History
- Opened: December 29, 1978
- Electrified: Third rail
- Former names: Komsomolskaya

Services
Preceding station	Saint Petersburg Metro	Following station
Terminus	Line 1	Grazhdansky Prospekt towards Prospekt Veteranov
Location

Devyatkino (Russian: Девя́ткино; known as Komsomolskaya, Russian: Комсомóльская until July 1, 1992) is a station of the Saint Petersburg Metro and an integrated hub with the St. Petersburg–Kuznechnoye railway. It is the northern terminus of the Kirovsko–Vyborgskaya Line.

Located in the town of Murino (Vsevolozhsky District of Leningrad Oblast), it is the only metro station outside the St. Petersburg city limits. It was the first station in Russia built on the territory of another federal subject.

Until 1982, it was the world's northernmost metro station before being surpassed by the Helsinki Metro.

== History ==
Devyatkino was opened on December 29, 1978, as part of the last segment of the line. At the time of its opening, the station was named Komsomolskaya to mark the 60th anniversary of the Komsomol (All-Union Leninist Young Communist League).

It was built in an open field near the then-small village of Murino specifically to relieve the overcrowded Finland Station and create the first major transport interchange hub in the USSR outside the city center.

Tens of thousands of residents and summer residents from the northern suburbs of Vsevolozhsky and Priozersky districts commuted daily by train to the city and then dispersed throughout it. The plan was to intercept this passenger flow: passengers only had to cross the platform to board the metro.

== Station layout and interchange ==
Like Rybatskoye, Kupchino and Parnas the station is located on the surface and connected to a commuter train station of the same name. It features a cross-platform interchange with the Devyatkino railway station [ru] — the second of its kind in the USSR after Vykhino in Moscow (built in 1966).

Southbound railway tracks run on the left side of the station while the northbound tracks are on the right, allowing for easy transfers between the metro and the commuter trains. The platforms are separated by walls and turnstiles, with underground passages providing exits to the city.

== Design ==
The station is a covered surface structure with side platforms. Its vault is made of reinforced concrete prefabricated elements supported by sparsely placed columns, and the floor is laid with light-yellow decorative tiles. Until April 2009, the walls featured large stained-glass windows, which were later replaced by brickwork, leaving windows only under the ceiling. The original fluorescent lighting was also later changed to mercury lamps.

== Gallery ==
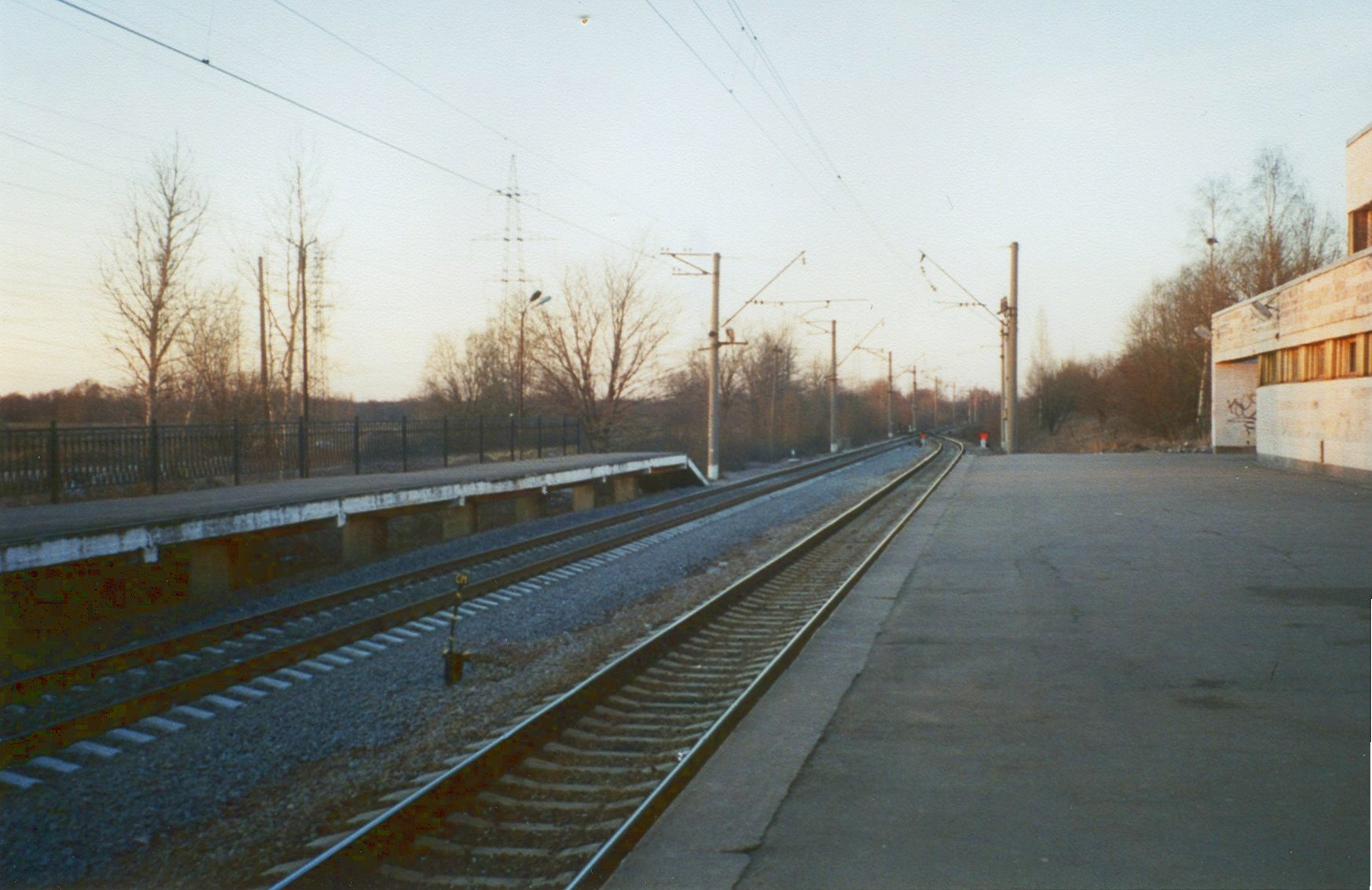
Devyatkino railway station
