= Prospekt Veteranov (Saint Petersburg Metro) =

Saint Petersburg Metro Station

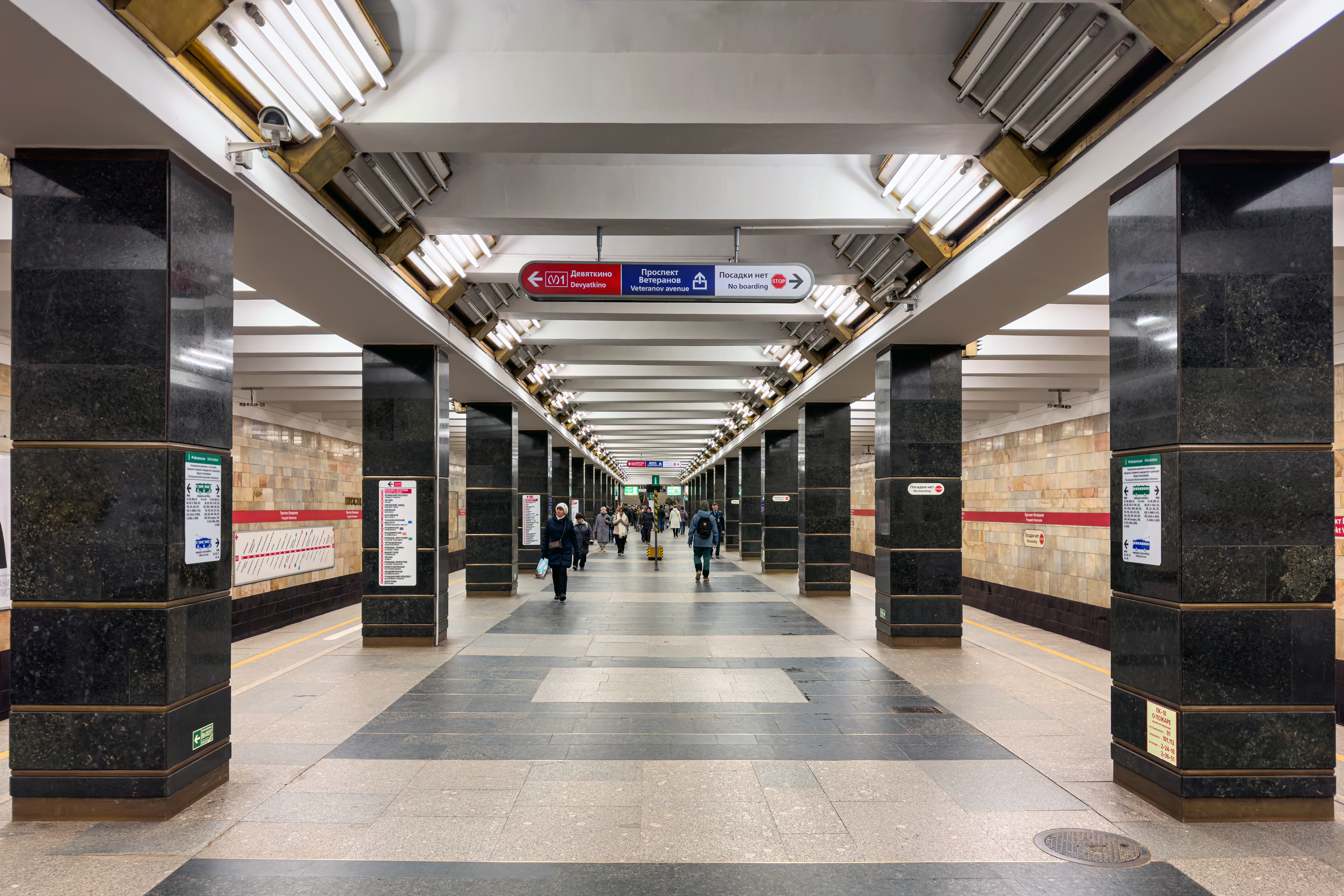
- Station Hall

General information
- Location: Kirovsky District; Saint Petersburg; Russia
- Coordinates: 59°50′30″N 30°15′14″E
- System: Saint Petersburg Metro station
- Operator: Saint Petersburg Metro
- Line: Kirovsko–Vyborgskaya Line
- Platforms: 1 (Island platform)
- Tracks: 2

Construction
- Structure type: Underground
- Depth: 8 metres (26 ft)

History
- Opened: October 5, 1977
- Electrified: Third rail

Services
Preceding station	Saint Petersburg Metro	Following station
Leninsky Prospekt towards Devyatkino	Line 1	Terminus
Location

Prospekt Veteranov (Russian: Проспе́кт Ветера́нов, Avenue of Veterans) is a station on the south end of Kirovsko-Vyborgskaya Line of the Saint Petersburg Metro, next to Leninsky Prospekt.

The station was opened on October 5, 1977, along with Leninsky Prospekt. It is located near the beginning of the street of the same name.

This station has no above-ground pavilion. Entrance to the station (like to Leninsky Prospekt) is provided through underground pedestrian crossings, with exits onto Prospekt Veteranov and Dachny Prospekt. The station's exit does not have escalators either.

Prospekt Veteranov is a shallow column station lying in a depth of 8 metres (26 ft). The underground hall was constructed as a project of the architect V. G. Khiltchenko and the engineer S. P. Schukin. Memorial style corresponds the name of the station.

The station is remarkable because it is the most crowded metro station in Russia, due to the large part of the city that it serves. Prospekt Veteranov accepts about 200,000 passengers daily.

Buses operate between the station and Peterhof Palace.
