= Muzhestva Square =

Public square in Saint Petersburg, Russia

Coordinates: 59°59′54″N 30°21′49″E

Ploschad Muzhestva and its surroundings on Openstreetmap

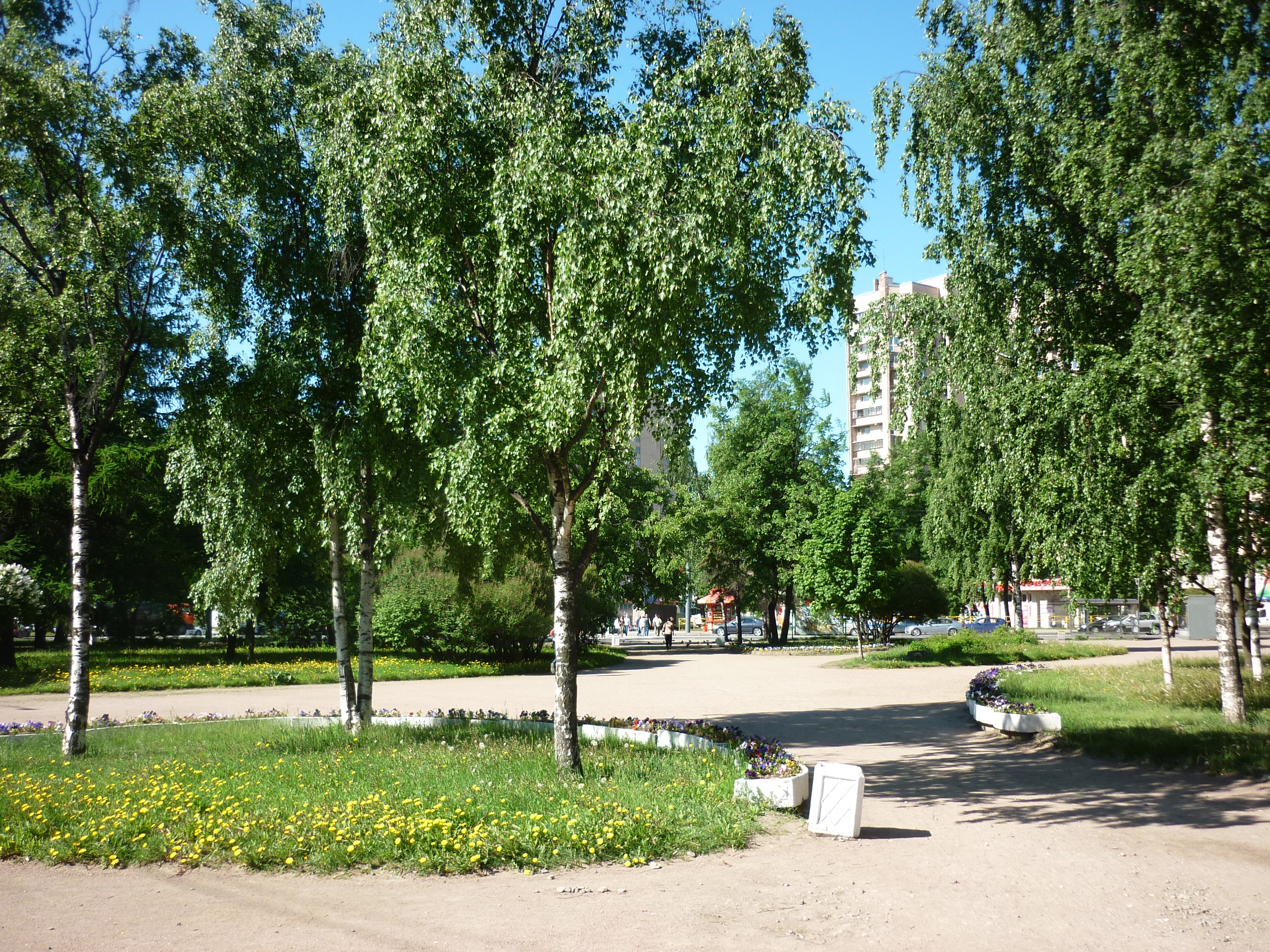
Ploschad Muzhestva

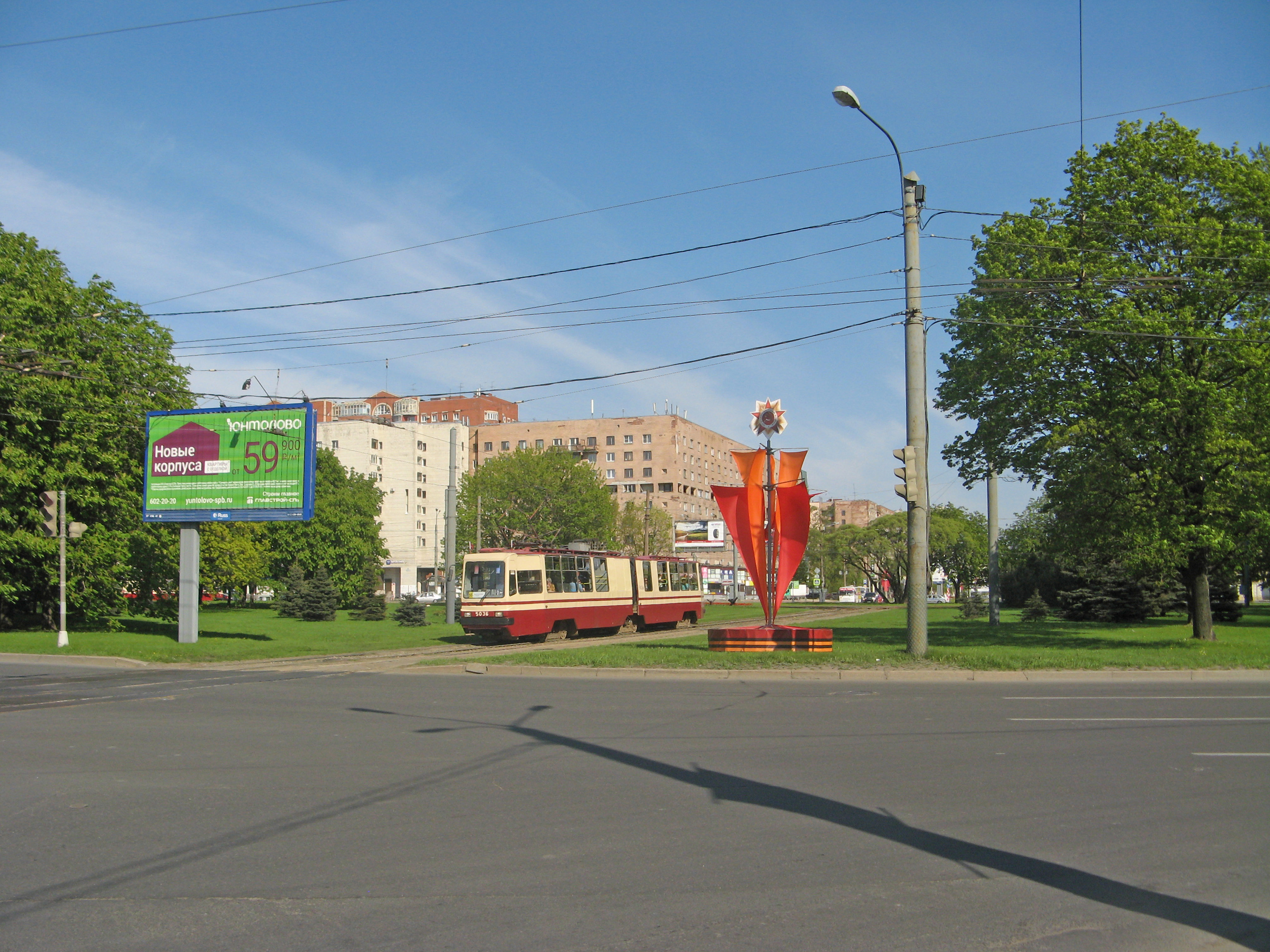
Roundabout

Ploschad Muzhestva (Russian: Пло́щадь Му́жества, IPA: [ˈploɕːɪtʲ ˈmuʐɨstvə], lit. 'Square of Fortitude') is an open public square, shaped as a roundabout, in the north-east of Saint Petersburg, Russia. Its name and decoration commemorate the fortitude city dwellers demonstrated during the nearly 900-day-long 1941–44 Nazi Germany Siege of Leningrad as the square opens the way to the biggest burial place of the siege victims Piskaryovskoye Memorial Cemetery.

The underground station of the same name opened next to the square on 31 December 1975.

The square joins five streets, two of which form northeastern roughly latitudinal part of the city's Central Arc Thoroughfare that as a whole connects much of the city's uptown residential areas with southwestern and northwestern suburban motorways. Mostly nearly longitudinal Polytechnical Street and its northern coaxials mark the boundary between Vyborg District and Kalinin District of the city.

== Overview ==
=== Site and name ===
The square and the station were designed on the route to Piskaryovskoye Memorial Cemetery where hundreds of thousands people, mostly civilian victims, are buried from the 1941–44 siege of the city during World War II.

=== Road connections ===
The roundabout joins five streets. One of them, Politekhnicheskaya ulitsa (Polytechnical Street), passes through it tangentially to the central island. The street was named after the city's Polytechnical Institute and links the square with the institute northwards, and, to the southwest, with the Kushelevka railway station, Forest Institute neighbourhood, and streets leading to downtown St Petersburg. In the second half of the 20th century, the street got two metro stations and was continued in the newer northern built up residential areas by Tikhoretskiy Prospekt (Tikhoretsk Avenue) and Prospekt Kultury (Culture Avenue), the three streets making a single thoroughfare that reaches the northern city boundary and the Saint Petersburg Ring Road, over a junction with which a motorway goes north into suburban Vsevolozhsk District of Leningrad Oblast.

Four other streets start or end at the Muzhestva roundabout. Prospekt Nepokoryonnykh (Avenue of the Unconquered) goes roughly eastwards, and takes visitors to Piskaryovskoye Memorial Cemetery on the left-hand side of the street. In the 21st century the avenue was seamlessly reconnected as part of Central Arc Thoroughfare with Shafirov Avenue by an interchange over Piskaryovskiy Prospekt, thus making two other connections with the Ring Road and new residential and industrial areas of the urban and suburban northeast.

Prospekt Morisa Toreza (Maurice Thorez Avenue, named so in the Soviet times) goes northwest, to the densely populated Ozerki neighbourhood and meets Severniy Prospekt (Northern Avenue) and Prospekt Engelsa (Friedrich Engels Avenue) at the highest point of the city's north - Poklonnaya gora (Russian for Bowing Mountain), a 30-meter-tall hill.

To the west of the square goes Vtoroy Murinskiy Prospekt (Rus. for 2nd Murino Avenue, Murino being a now redeveloping village at the northeast boundary of the city, with several lanes and streets named after it in the vicinity on the way to the settlement). The avenue also reaches at its western end Prospekt Engelsa, at Svetlana Square, from which another major road goes westwards into the residential areas of the former Commandant's Airfield (Komendantskiy aerodrom) and of the Long Lake (Ozero Dolgoye).

== See also ==
- List of squares in Saint Petersburg
