= Ploschad Muzhestva (Saint Petersburg Metro) =

Saint Petersburg Metro Station

Ploshchad Muzhestva
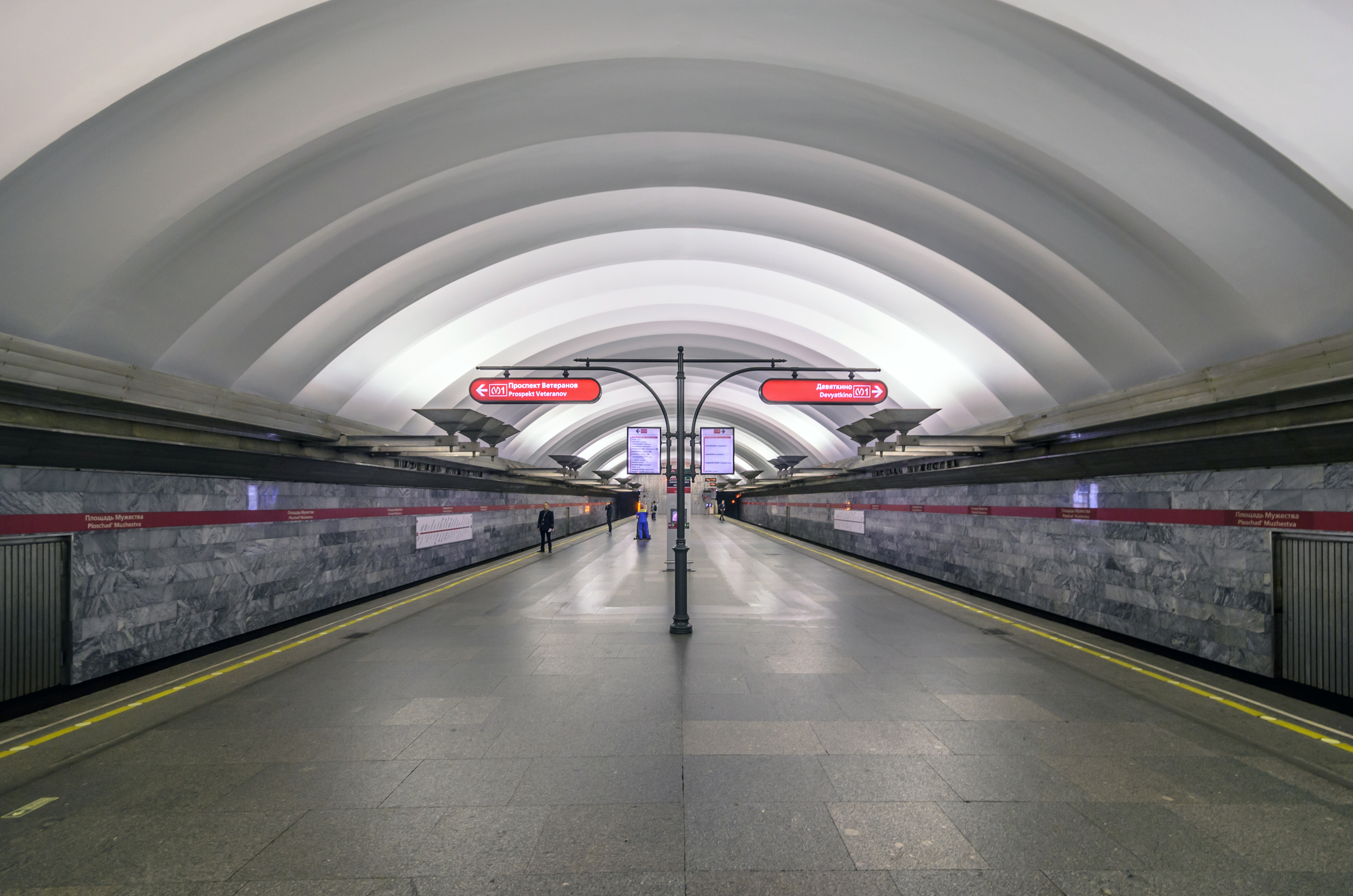
- Platform Hall

General information
- Location: Kalininsky District; Saint Petersburg; Russia
- Coordinates: 59°59′59.08″N 30°21′58.17″E
- System: Saint Petersburg Metro station
- Owner: Saint Petersburg Metro
- Line: Kirovsko–Vyborgskaya Line
- Platforms: 1 (Island platform)
- Tracks: 2
- Connections: Bus: 9, 40, 80, 123, 138, 222, 250, 251, 271, 275, 294, 399 Tram: 38, 40, 55, 61 Trolleybus: 4, 6, 21, 51

Construction
- Structure type: Underground
- Depth: 67 m (220 ft)
- Cycle facilities: Yes

Other information
- Station code: МТ

History
- Opened: December 31, 1975
- Electrified: Third rail

Services
Preceding station	Saint Petersburg Metro	Following station
Politekhnicheskaya towards Devyatkino	Line 1	Lesnaya towards Prospekt Veteranov
Route map
Location

Ploshchad Muzhestva (Russian: Пло́щадь Му́жества, lit. “Square of Fortitude”) is a station of the Saint Petersburg Metro. It is located on the Kirovsko-Vyborgskaya line between Politekhnicheskaya and Lesnaya stations and opened on December 31, 1975.

The station takes its name from the adjacent Muzhestva Square. Its decorative theme is dedicated to the heroism and resilience of Leningraders during the 1941–1944 Siege of Leningrad.

== Memorial context ==
Both the square and the station were conceived as a starting point on the way to the Piskaryovskoye Memorial Cemetery, where hundreds of thousands of victims are buried. Prospekt Nepokorennykh (Russian: Проспект Непокоренных, lit. “Avenue of the Unconquered”) begins at the square and leads directly to the memorial, and the “Blockade Well” [ru] monument is located nearby.

== Surface vestibule ==
The station’s surface pavilion features a compact rectangular hall faced with white marble, with a cluster of hanging fixtures (the originals were removed in 2004). Originally, the vestibule had two exits; the one leading to the courtyards of Politekhnicheskaya Street is no longer in use.

== Underground section ==
Together with the adjacent Politekhnicheskaya station, it is one of the first single-vault deep-level stations built in the world; it lies at a depth of 67 meters. The concrete segments for their vaults were uniquely developed by the Leningrad Experimental Plant, featuring an exceptionally thin “umbrella” thickness of just 20 mm.

The track walls are faced with gray marble, and the floor is made of gray granite. The lighting consists of original fixtures stylized as bowls of the Eternal Flame. The southern end wall bears an inscription in large letters without any commas:

“Glory to the heroes who defended you Leningrad”

(Russian: «Слава героям тебя Ленинград отстоявшим»).

The northern end is covered with aluminum strips and crowned with an illuminated five-pointed star.

Planned as a terminus, the station's track layout was altered due to the 1974 washout. During the severe 1995–2004 washout [ru] the station served as the northern terminus of the line, with a temporary reversing siding built and all trains using a single track. This period is also associated with bus route No. 80, which ran between Lesnaya and Ploshchad Muzhestva; city authorities promised never to reuse the route number afterward, though the decision was not kept after ten years.

In 2005, for the 60th anniversary of Victory, the southern end wall was faced with composite panels and the inscription was gilded. In 2009–2010, the track walls were re-faced due to cracks, and in 2017 and 2022, the lighting was updated.
