= Prospekt Nepokoryonnykh =

Street in Saint Petersburg, Russia

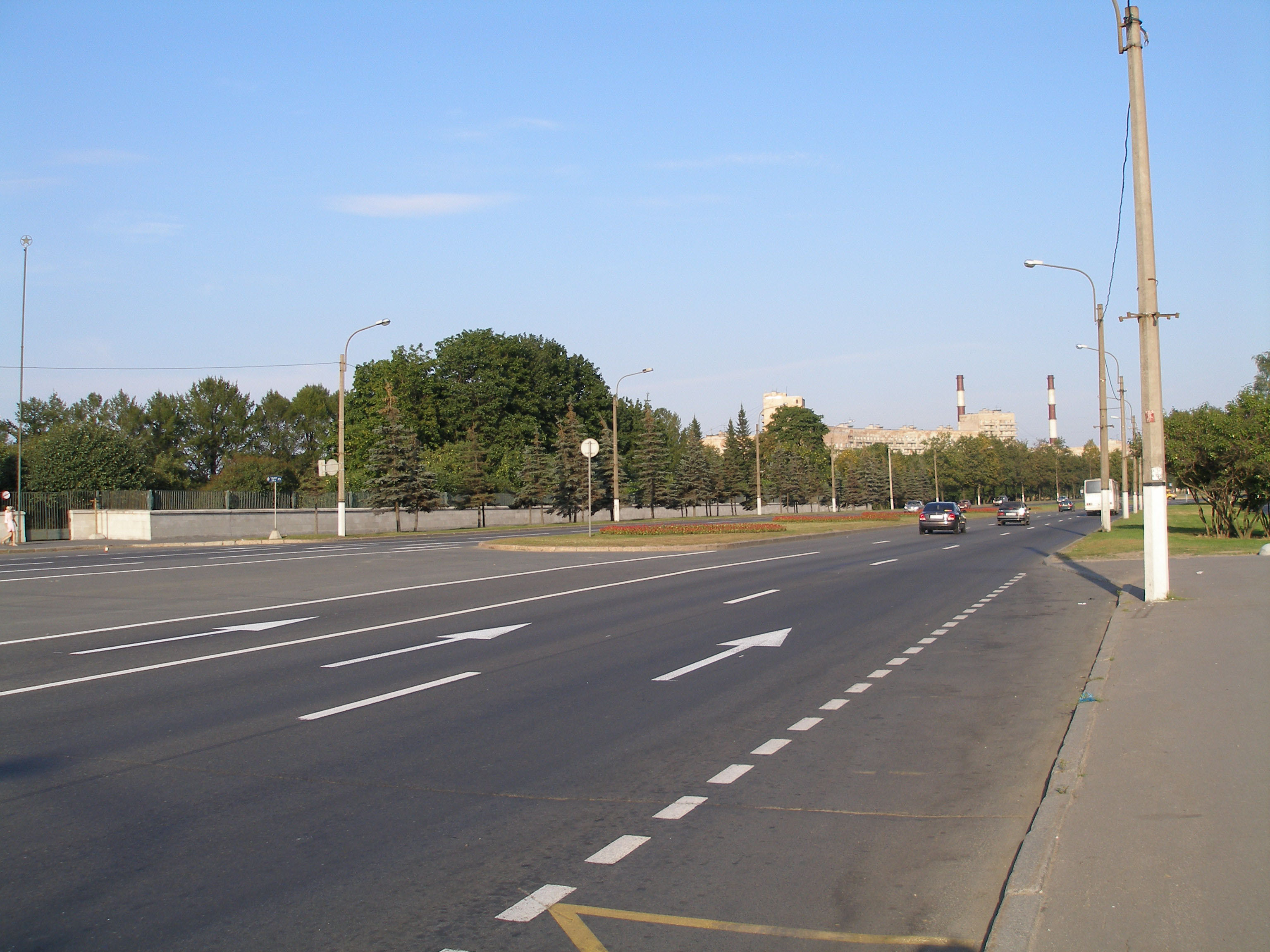
View from Piskaryovskoye Memorial Cemetery towards Piskaryovsky Prospekt

Prospekt Nepokoryonnykh (Russian: Проспект Непокорённых, Russian for Avenue of the Unconquered) is a street in the northeast of Saint Petersburg, Russia, in Kalininsky District of the city.

It has significance as it forms a part of the city's Central Arc Thoroughfare (Rus. Центральная дуговая магистраль) and connects Muzhestva Square (Square of Fortitude) with crosswise to it going downtown Piskaryovskiy Prospekt (Piskaryovka Avenue) and passes by Piskaryovskoye Memorial Cemetery, the last resting place for hundreds of thousands mostly civilian victims of the 1941–44 World War II siege of the city by Nazi Germany. The memorial that opened in 1960s gave the idea of the present names for the square and the avenue, given in 1964 to mark 20th anniversary of lifting the siege on 27 January 1944.

== Features ==
- Piskaryovskoye Memorial Cemetery
- Memorial plaque at the house number 6 (1979, architect A. Ya. Svirsky, sculptor M. L. Kruppa), where there was a well, from which drowned the inhabitants of the besieged Leningrad.
- At the corner of Prospekt Nepokoryonnykh and Grazhdansky Avenue, Lyutikovo metochion of the Holy Trinity Monastery of the Kaluga Eparchy was founded (founded in 1897 by Hieromonk Amvrosiy with the blessing of John of Kronstadt), included:
  - Two-headed wooden Trinity Church (consecrated February 12, 1898, restored after the fire in 1907, demolished in 1967), which August 4, 1898, visited Nicholas II, Emperor of Russia;
  - Five-domed stone temple of the Tikhvin icon of the Mother of God (architect N.N.Nikonov, 1905–1913, closed in 1934, blown up in 1982).
