= Ozerki =

Ozerki may refer to:

- Ozerki (rural locality) (Ozyorki), several rural localities in Russia
- Ozerki railway station, a railway station in north of Saint Petersburg
- Ozerki (Saint Petersburg Metro), a station of the Saint Petersburg Metro
- Ozerki (Historic district in Saint Petersburg), a historic district in Saint Petersburg
