= Finlyandsky =

Finlyandsky (masculine), Finlyandskaya (feminine), or Finlyandskoye (neuter) may refer to:

- Finlyandsky Municipal Okrug, a municipal okrug of Kalininsky District of the federal city of St. Petersburg, Russia
- Finland Station (Finlyandsky vokzal), a rail terminal in St. Petersburg, Russia
