= Kalininsky District, Saint Petersburg =

Kalininsky District Калининский район (Russian)
- District
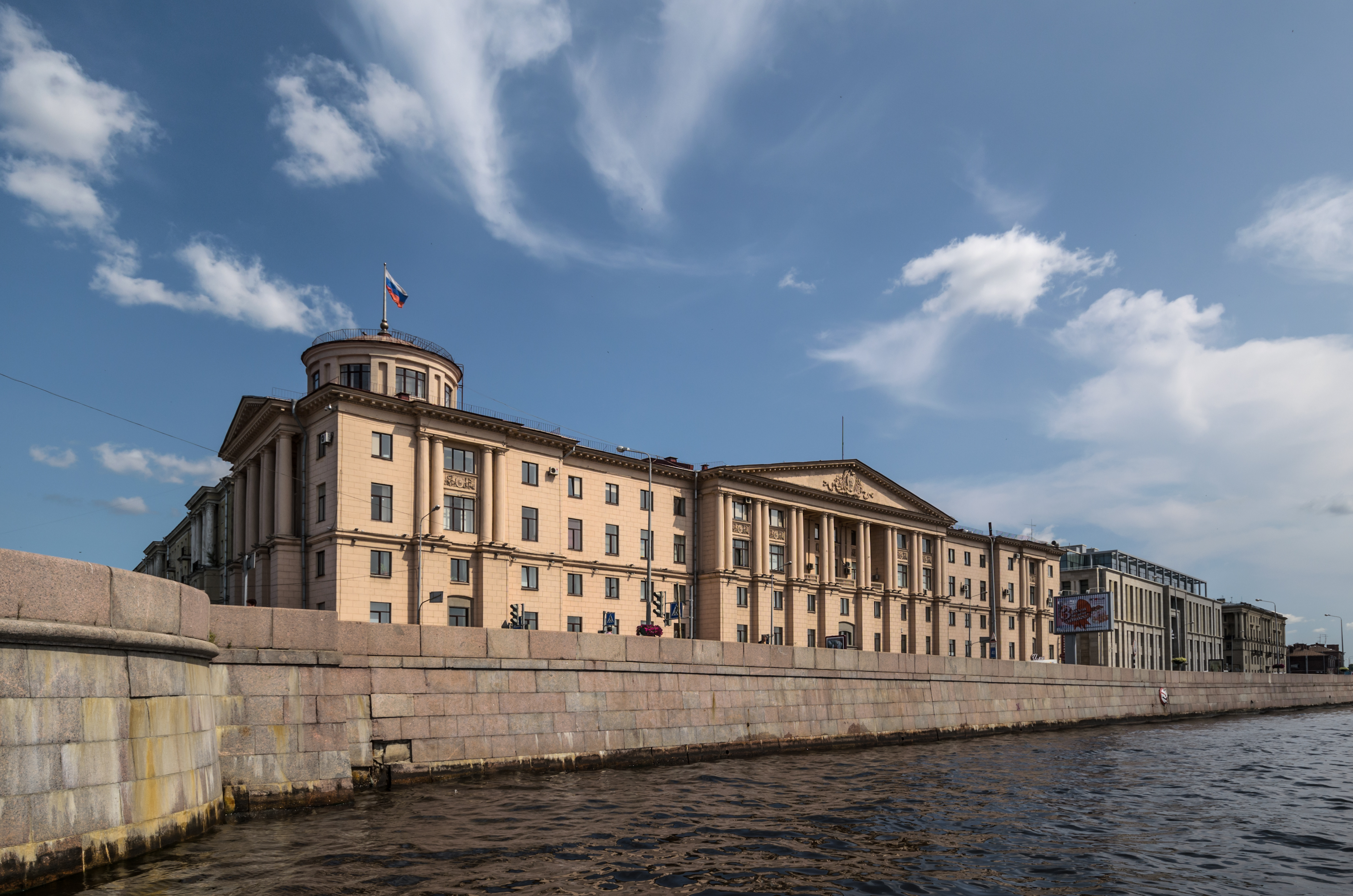
- Kalininsky District Administration building
- Kalininsky District in St. Petersburg
- Coordinates: 60°00′N 30°24′E
- Country: Russia
- Federal subject: federal city of St. Petersburg
- Established: 1936

Area
  - Total: 40.12 km^{2} (15.49 sq mi)

Population
  - Estimate (2025): 532 972
- Website: http://gov.spb.ru/gov/terr/reg_kalinin/

Kalininsky District (Russian: Кали́нинский райо́н) is a district of the federal city of St. Petersburg, Russia.

Located in the northern part of the city on the right bank of the Neva River, Kalininsky District is bordered by the Vyborgsky and Krasnogvardeysky districts, as well as the Vsevolozhsky District of Leningrad Oblast.

As of 2025, its population was estimated at over 532,000, making it the second most populous district in Saint Petersburg after Primorsky District. It covers an area of 40.12 km².

The district is traditionally known as one of the greenest and most comfortable in the city, with public parks covering about 30% of its territory, and total greenery (including courtyards) exceeding 50%. It also has a reputation as a major scientific and research center.

== Etymology ==
The district was named after Mikhail Kalinin (1875–1946), Russian Soviet Bolshevik revolutionary and politician.

Historically, the area was part of the Vyborg Side, developing as an artillery cluster under Peter the Great in the early 18th century before becoming a major industrial hub.

== Municipal divisions ==
Kalininsky District comprises the following seven municipal okrugs:

- #21
- Akademicheskoye
- Finlyandsky
- Grazhdanka
- Piskaryovka
- Prometey
- Severny

== History ==
The historical nucleus of the district, together with its western neighbor Vyborgsky District, is in the south, on the right bank of the Neva, forming the traditionally industrial Vyborg Side.

Many factories, opened there in the 19th century by Russian and European entrepreneurs, were nationalized after the 1917 Revolution and further developed until the fall of the Soviet Union.

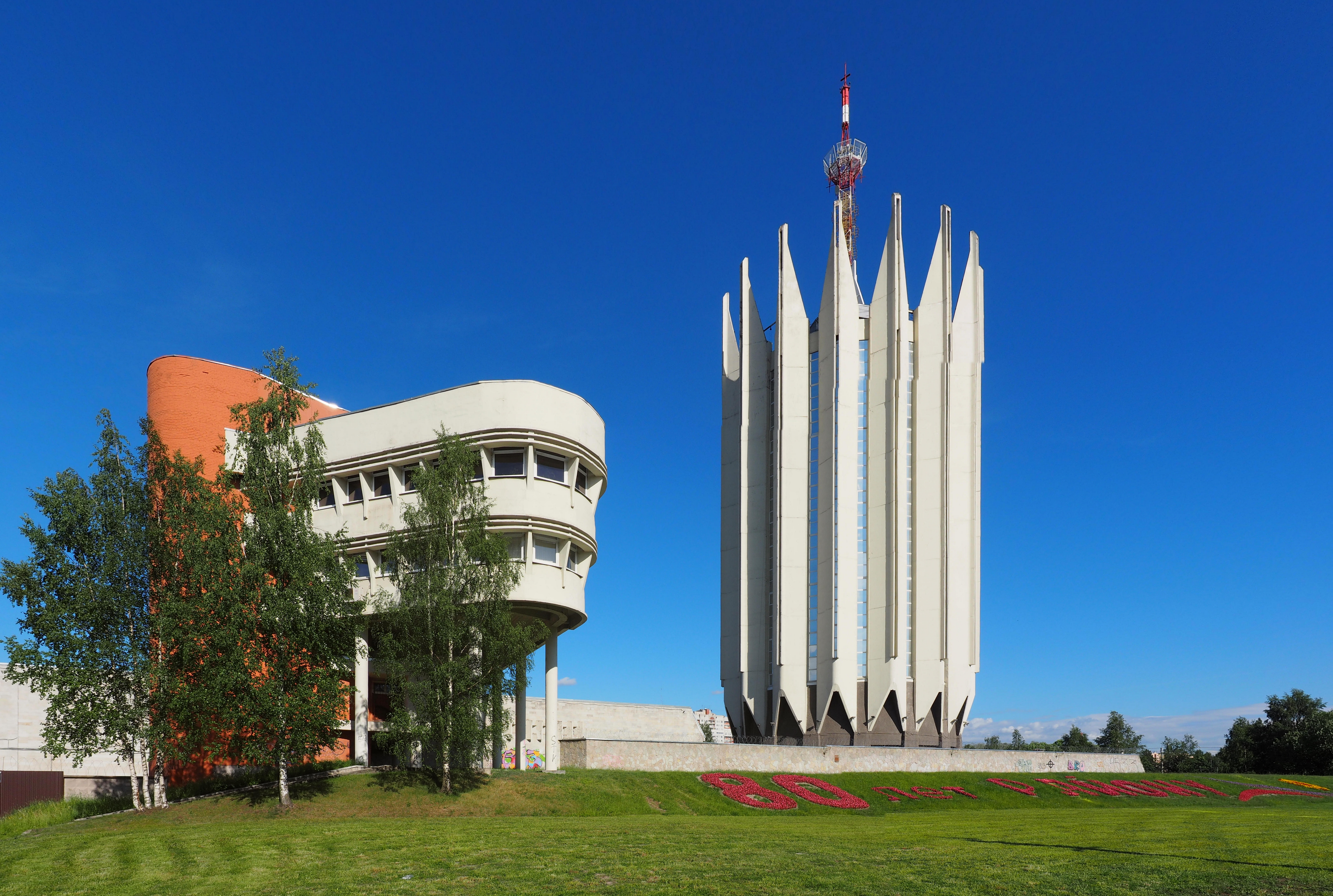
Russian State Scientific Center for Robotics and Technical Cybernetics

To the north, several rural and semi-rural settlements (such as Polyustrovo, Kushelevka and Grazhdanka) existed until the mid-20th century. Since the early 1960s, these areas have given way to mass-produced 5-, 9-, and 12-story concrete apartment blocks with spacious green courtyards, forming modern residential neighborhoods.

However, the northern part of the district was not developed merely as a standard bedroom community. It was deliberately planned as a major scientific and academic hub. The presence of the Polytechnic University and numerous newly established research institutes attracted a specific demographic—the scientific and technical intelligentsia.

This profound scientific character shaped the local identity, characterized by the tradition of naming local streets after prominent scientists and cultural figures.

== Transport ==
Due to its strategic location and diverse infrastructure, Kalininsky District possesses connected public transit networks to integrate heavy rail, subway, and surface transit (buses, trams and trolleybuses).

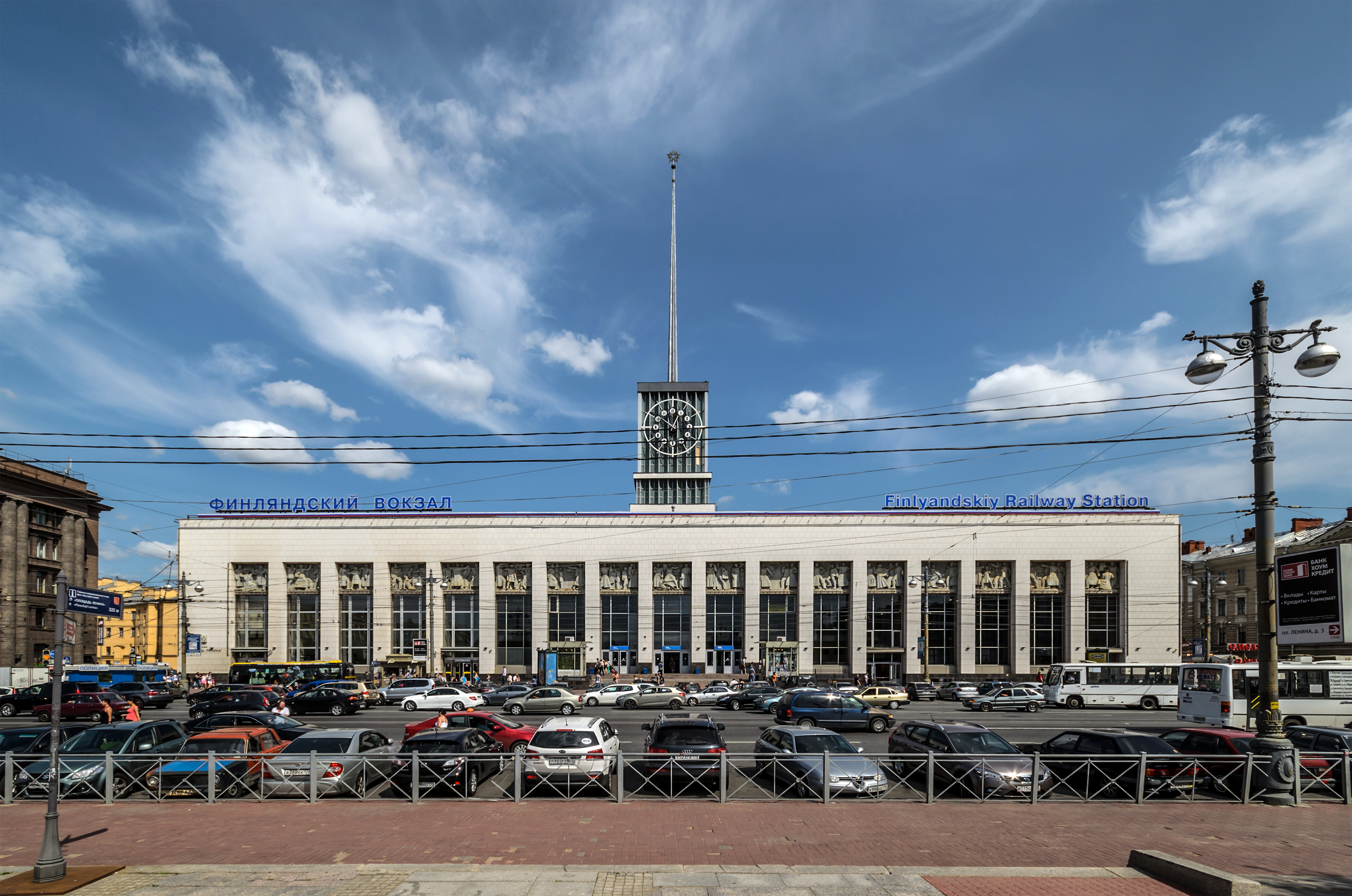
Finlyandsky Railway Station

The district is served by five stations of the Kirovsko-Vyborgskaya Line of the Saint Petersburg Metro: Ploshchad Lenina, Ploshchad Muzhestva, Politekhnicheskaya, Akademicheskaya, and Grazhdansky Prospekt.

Additionally, the district hosts the Finlyandsky Railway Station, a major intercity and commuter rail terminal, along with several commuter train stations (Kushelevka, Piskarevka, Ruchyi, and Novaya Okhta) on the Priozersk direction.

== Economy and Science ==
Kalininsky is an industrial district with about 30 large enterprises, the most famous being the Leningrad Metal Plant, Krasny Vyborzhets [ru], and LOMO. The main industrial facilities are concentrated in the southern part of the district.

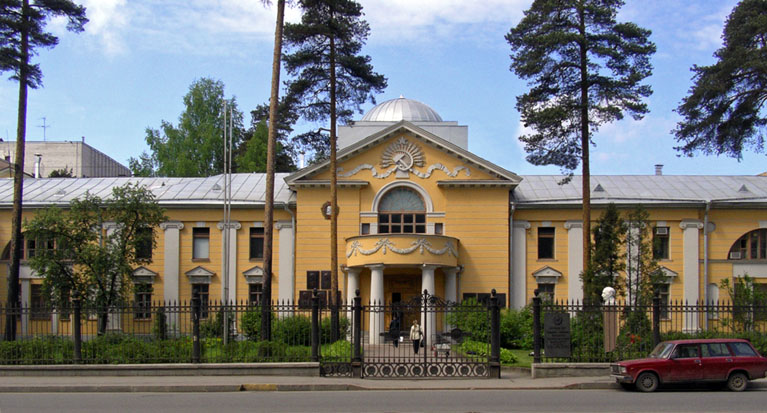
Ioffe Institute

During the Soviet era, several major industrial research and development institutes were established here, many rooted in the local Polytechnic Institute. A massive cluster of research and development facilities emerged around the institute in the northern part of the district, cementing its status as a major scientific center.

Today, the district is one of the leading scientific centers in Russia. A significant portion of its research institutes are concentrated in the Akademicheskoye municipal okrug [ru].

Major institutions include the Ioffe Institute, the Central Research Institute of Robotics and Technical Cybernetics (CRIRTTC), the Vedeneev VNIIG, and the Vreden National Medical Research Center.

== Education ==
St. Petersburg Polytechnic University

The district hosts several prominent higher education institutions, most notably:

- Peter the Great St. Petersburg Polytechnic University.
- St. Petersburg Academic University named after Zh. I. Alferov.
- Mikhailovskaya Military Artillery Academy.
- Kirov Military Medical Academy.

== Landmarks ==
The district is home to numerous historical and cultural monuments:

- Piskaryovskoye Memorial Cemetery: The world's largest wartime cemetery and the main memorial to the victims of the Siege of Leningrad. It contains 186 mass graves holding over 420,000 civilians and 50,000 soldiers.
- Piskaryovskoye Memorial Cemetery
  Scientific Center for Robotics and Technical Cybernetics Tower-Laboratory: One of the most famous world masterpieces of Soviet modernism, resembling a "concrete tulip." Built between 1973 and 1986, it houses a vertical aerodynamic tube used for testing space technology. Notably, the entire northern part of the district (Grazhdanka area [ru]) serves as a de facto open-air museum of Soviet modernism. Developed mostly under the 1956–1966 General Plan, it features outstanding research institute complexes and experimental buildings like the "Bublik" center and "Sovremennik" [ru] cinema.
- Polytechnic Campus: A vast university complex with a park, built between 1899 and 1903 in Neoclassical and Art Nouveau styles. Its symbol is the fairytale-like Hydraulic Tower (1905). Local legend claims that after 1917 Revolution, the Bolsheviks cremated Grigori Rasputin's body in the university's boiler house because at the time its steam boiler was considered the most powerful furnace in Petrograd.
- Kresty Prison: One of the most famous and largest prisons in Europe, built in 1884–1892 with a distinctive cruciform layout. There is a plan to revitalize this space into a creative cluster, after the prison facility was relocated in 2017 to Kolpino.
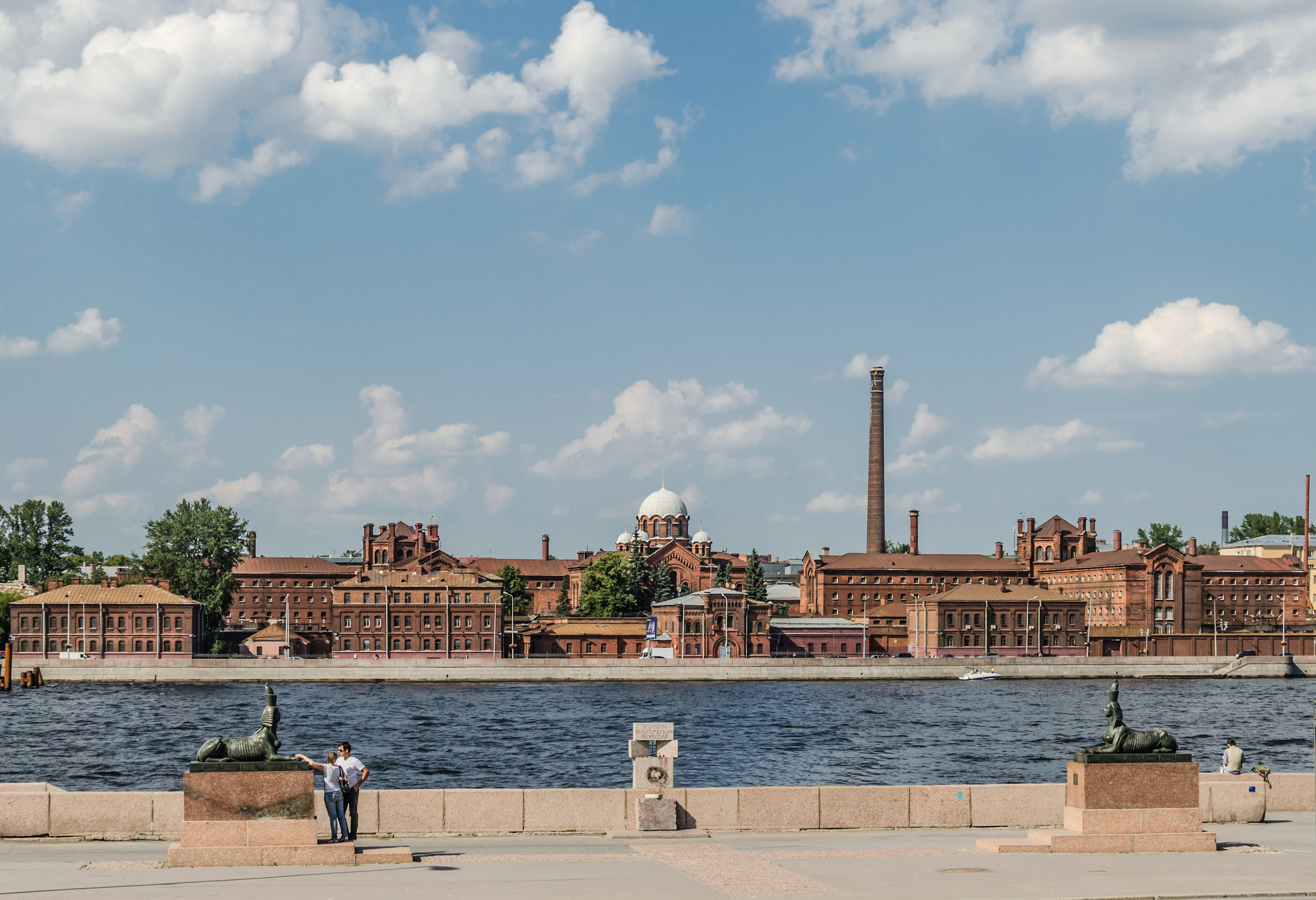
- Kresty Prison
  Finlyandsky Railway Station: The main terminal for northern routes. The current modernist building (1960) features a 70-meter clock tower. It is historically significant as the site of Lenin's return from exile in 1917 and as the starting point of the "Road of Life" during the Siege of Leningrad.
- Parks: These include the Piskaryovsky Forest Park [ru] (one of the largest natural forests within the city limits) and Murinsky Park [ru]. Another notable green space is the Benois Garden [ru], a unique former dairy farm complex. It features original red-brick structures, including a silo tower and a barn, while the main house was reconstructed in 2015 with some alterations to its original design.
- Historical Dachas: The district preserves a unique layer of estate architecture from the 18th–19th centuries. This includes the Durnovo Dacha [ru] (late 18th century), an outstanding monument of Russian classicism, and the Bezborodko Dacha [ru], a stone (brick and stucco) two-story mansion with its famous "lion" fence.
- Round Baths
  The Nobel Folk House [ru] and (1897–1901) and Emanuel Nobel's Residence (1902–1904) are fine examples of Northern Art Nouveau architecture.
- Soviet Constructivist Architecture: The southern part of the district features a significant cluster of early Soviet avant-garde architecture. This includes the Kondratyevsky Residential Complex [ru] (1928–1931), one of the first "socialist reconstruction" neighborhoods in Leningrad; the Round Baths [ru] (1927–1930) on Muzhestva Square, a striking Constructivist monument shaped like a giant cylinder with an open-air pool; and the Gigant Cinema Theater [ru] (1934–1936), an early example of the transition from Constructivism to Stalinist architecture (with distinct Art Deco elements), built by architects Alexander Gegello and David Krichevsky. Notably, the square in front of the Gigant Cinema is historically significant as the site of the only public execution in Leningrad in the 20th century, where 8 Nazi war criminals were hanged in 1946.

== Sources ==
- Законодательное Собрание Санкт-Петербурга. Закон №411-68 от 25 июля 2005 г. «О территориальном устройстве Санкт-Петербурга», в ред. Закона №685-130 от 26 декабря 2014 г. «О внесении изменений в Закон Санкт-Петербурга "О территориальном устройстве Санкт-Петербурга" и Закон Санкт-Петербурга "О рассмотрении предложений о присвоении наименований географическим объектам"». Вступил в силу через 10 дней после дня официального опубликования, за исключением отдельных положений, вступающих в силу в иные сроки. Опубликован: "Новое в законодательстве Санкт-Петербурга", №22, 4 августа 2005 г. (Legislative Assembly of Saint Petersburg. Law #411-68 of July 25, 2005 On the Territorial Structure of Saint Petersburg, as amended by the Law #685-130 of December 26, 2014 On Amending the Law of Saint Petersburg "On the Territorial Structure of Saint Petersburg" and the Law of Saint Petersburg "On Considering the Suggestions to Assign Names to Geographical Objects". Effective as of after 10 days following the day of the official publication, with the exception of certain clauses taking effect on different dates.).
