= Lesnaya (Saint Petersburg Metro) =

Saint Petersburg Metro Station

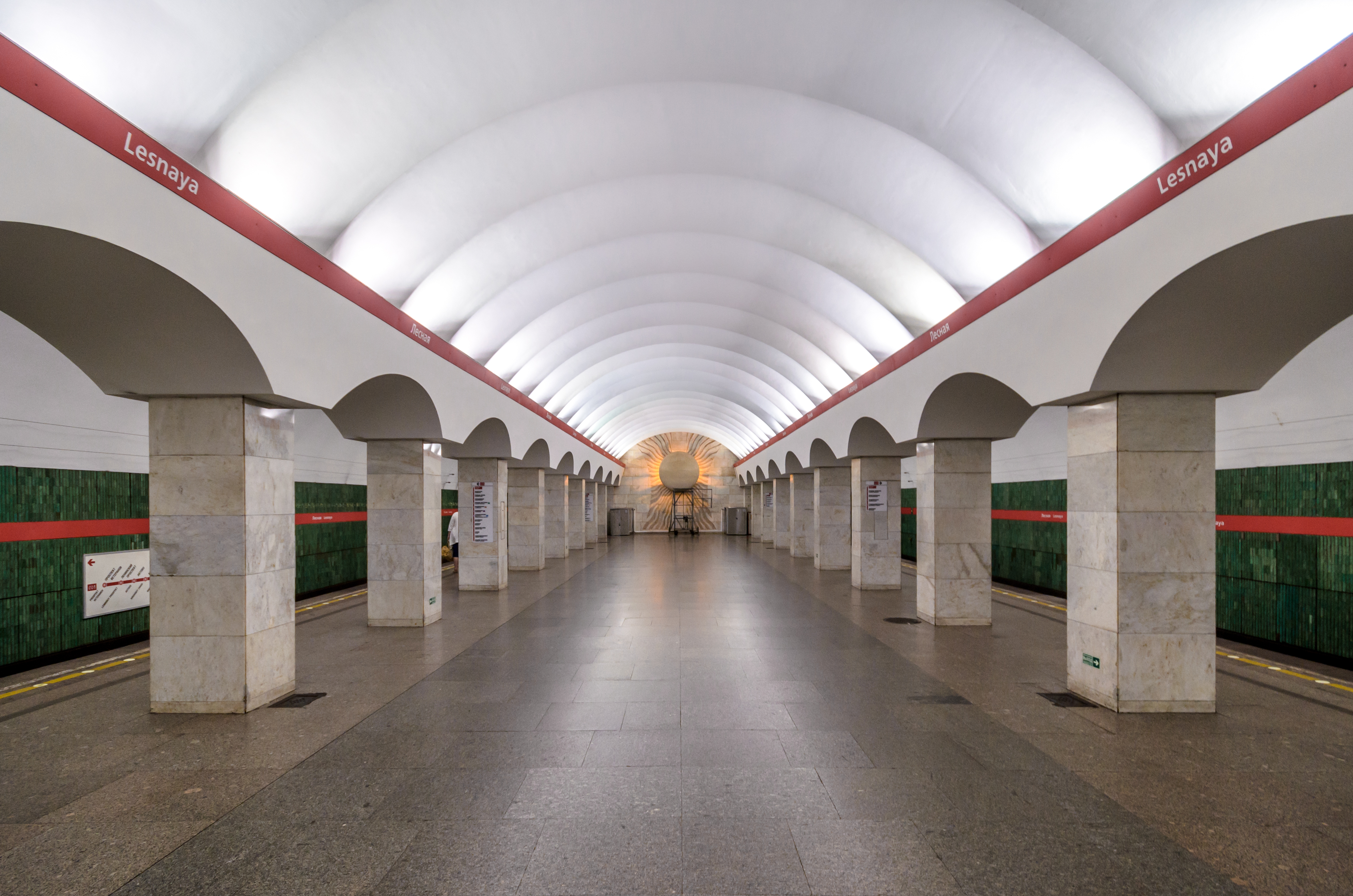
- Platform Hall

General information
- Location: Vyborgsky District; Saint Petersburg; Russia
- Coordinates: 59°59′5.32″N 30°20′39.57″E
- System: Saint Petersburg Metro station
- Operator: Saint Petersburg Metro
- Line: Kirovsko–Vyborgskaya Line
- Platforms: 1 (Island platform)
- Tracks: 2
- Connections: Bus: 33, 60, 137, 185, 237, 249, 251, 267, 275 Tram: 20, 61 Trolleybus: 18, 31

Construction
- Structure type: Underground
- Depth: 64 m (210 ft)

Other information
- Station code: ЛЕ

History
- Opened: April 22, 1975
- Rebuilt: 2017
- Electrified: Third rail

Services
Preceding station	Saint Petersburg Metro	Following station
Ploschad Muzhestva towards Devyatkino	Line 1	Vyborgskaya towards Prospekt Veteranov
Location

Lesnaya (Russian: Лесна́я, lit. “Forest”) is a station on the Kirovsko-Vyborgskaya Line of the Saint Petersburg Metro. It is located between Vyborgskaya and Ploshchad Muzhestva stations and opened on April 22, 1975, as part of the Ploshchad Lenina–Lesnaya segment.

== Name ==
The station is named after the historical district of Lesnoy [ru] and the nearby Lesnoy Prospekt (lit. “Forest Avenue”), which leads to the St. Petersburg State Forest Technical University. The station's name and its design are directly linked to this history.

The neighborhood historically developed around the Lesnoy Institute campus (lit. “Forest Institute”), a higher education forestry establishment founded in the early 19th century under Emperor Alexander I on the grounds of a former English farm. The institute has since grown into the Saint Petersburg State Forest Technical University and features a park that serves as one of the city's three botanical gardens.

== Surface vestibule ==
The ceiling of surface pavilion features metal beams arranged in triangles and squares, and a balcony overlooks the escalator tunnel, which contains three escalators.

== Underground section ==
Lesnaya is a deep-level column station (64 meters below ground). The columns are faced with white marble, and the floor is laid with gray granite. A notable feature is the track walls, which are faced with convex green ceramic tiles resembling malachite. The end wall of the hall is decorated with a backlit light composition titled "Sun" (sculptor P. A. Yakimovich).

== Renovations ==
On January 28, 2017, the station was closed for major renovations. During the renovation, the waterproofing of the escalator tunnel was restored, new water-diverting umbrellas were installed, and the original “light bollards” on the escalators were replaced with ceiling-mounted LED lighting. The turnstiles and video surveillance systems were modernized, and accessibility ramps were added. The station reopened on December 23, 2017, accompanied by a concert of Tchaikovsky's works.

== Geological conditions ==
The swampy geological conditions of the area, influenced by the proximity to the Neva River delta and the Baltic Sea, presented significant challenges during construction.

During the original excavation of the tunnels between Lesnaya and Ploshchad Muzhestva in the early 1970s, a washout occurred when water rushed into the hollowed space. This first washout was stopped using innovative and costly liquid nitrogen freezing. The line then operated successfully for 20 years.

However, in 1995, a second severe washout [ru] occurred, causing the tunnels to leak. Traffic was halted, and the line was temporarily cut into two unequal parts. From 1995 to 2004, Lesnaya served as the temporary southern terminus of the line, and a free bus route (No. 80) connected it to Ploshchad Muzhestva.

Replacement tunnel sections were built using an innovative Italian mining complex called “Victoria,” and through-service was finally restored in 2004, 8.5 years after the accident.

== Track development ==
North of the station, a crossover was originally built but dismantled in December 1975 after the line was extended to Akademicheskaya. Temporary tracks in the reversing tunnel were later installed during the 1995 washout and dismantled again in June 2004.

The station is planned to become a transfer hub for the future Ring Line of the Saint Petersburg Metro (Lesnaya-2 station).

== Gallery ==
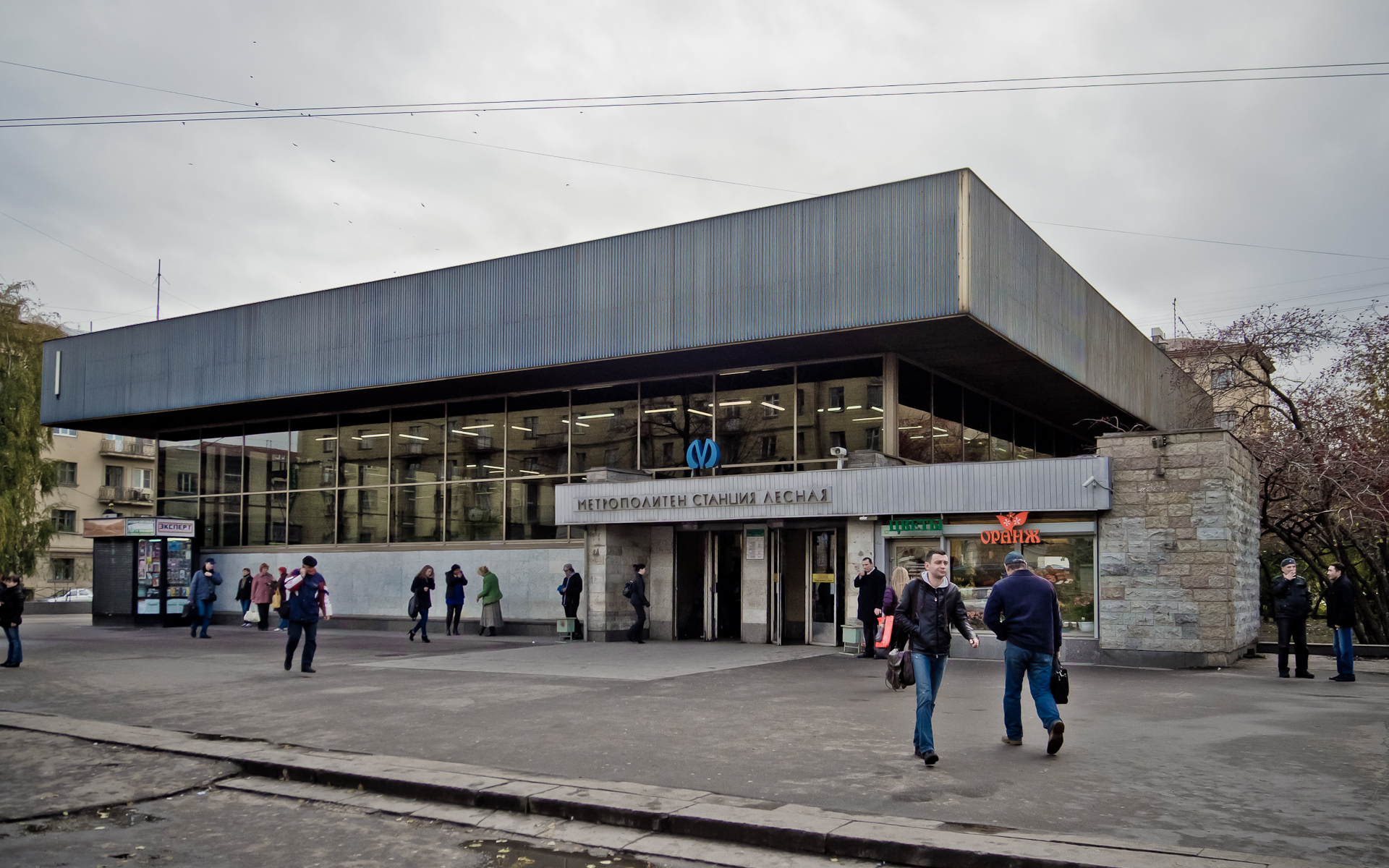
Surface pavilion

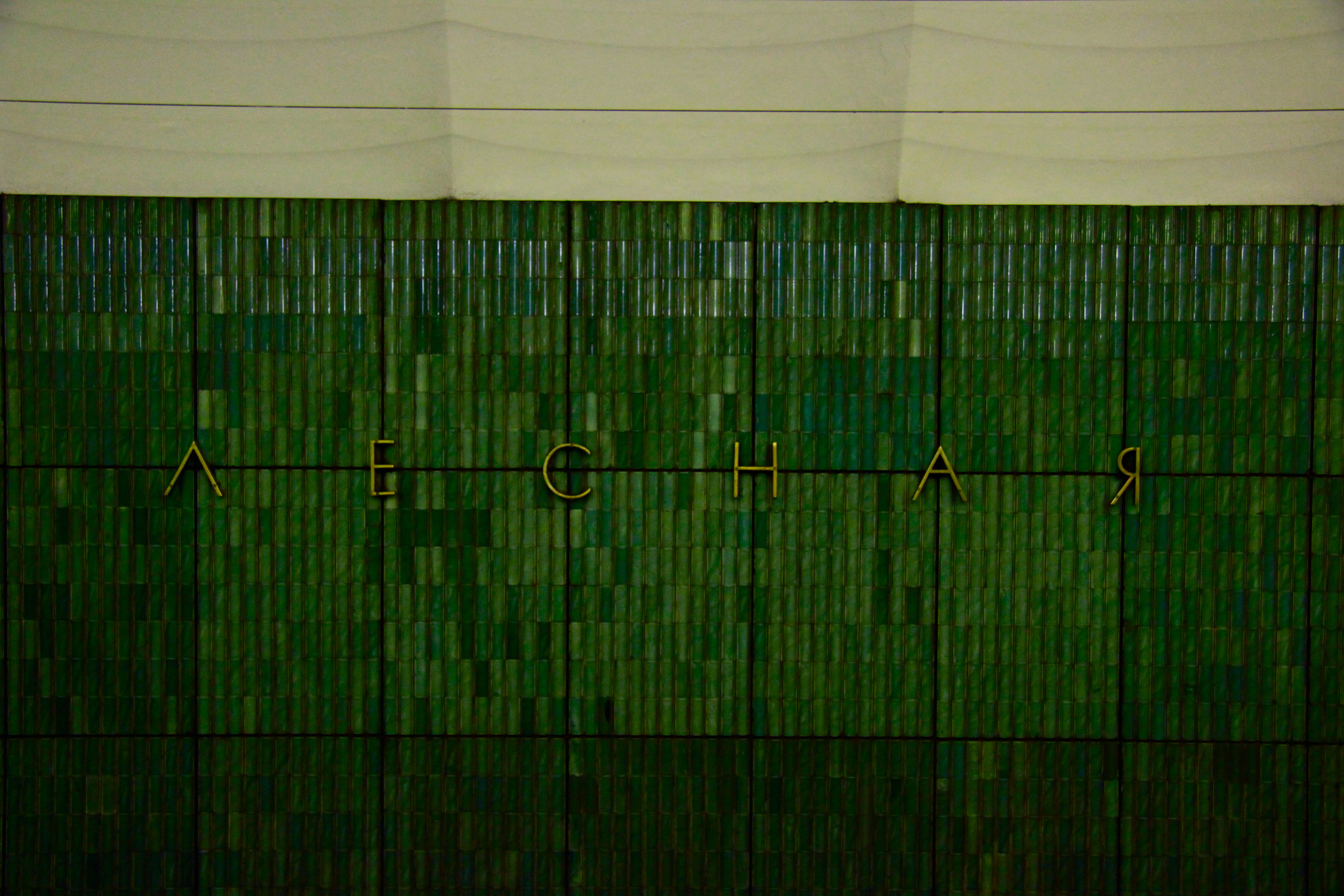
Original green ceramic tiles on the track wall, reflecting the station's forest theme

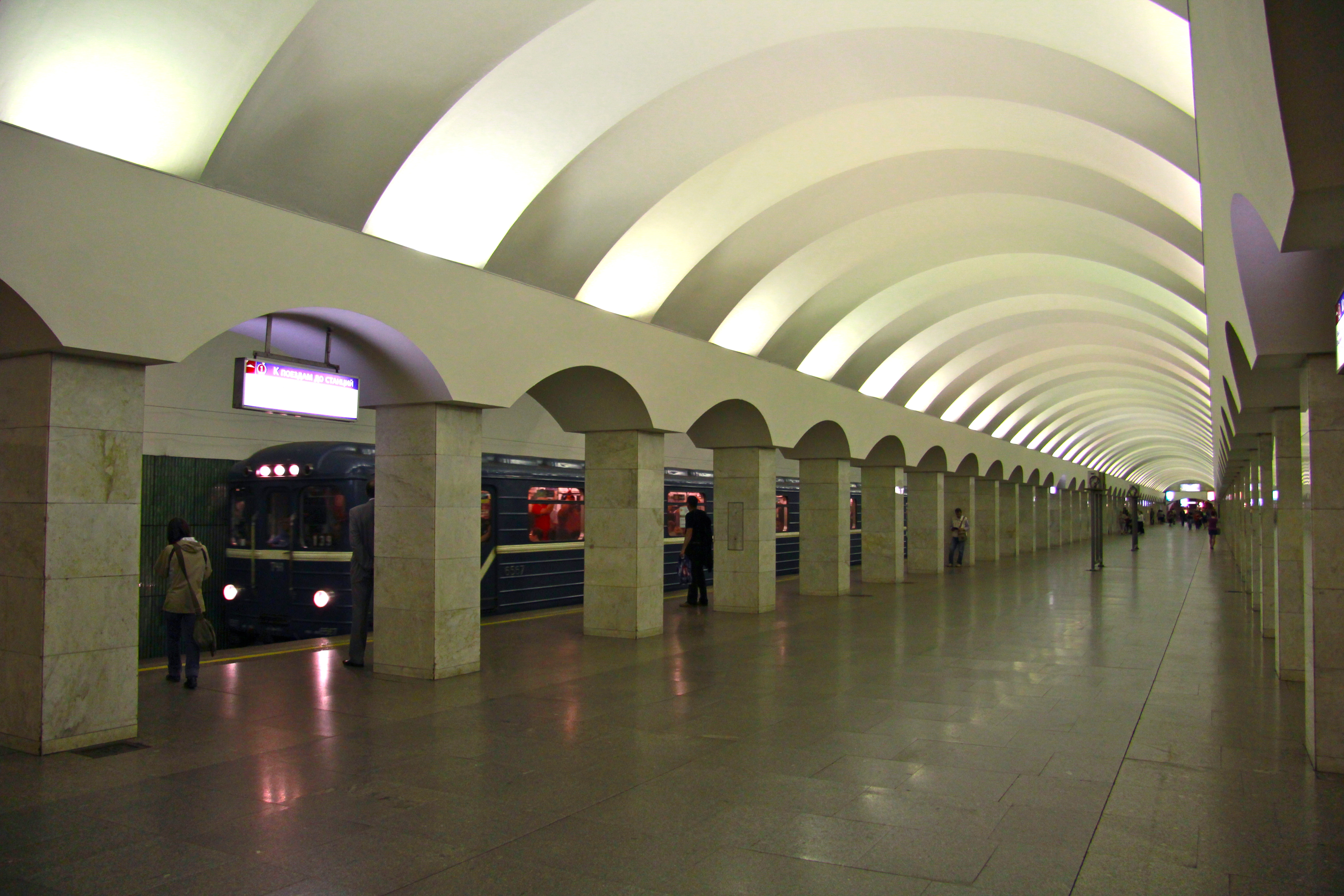
Platform hall

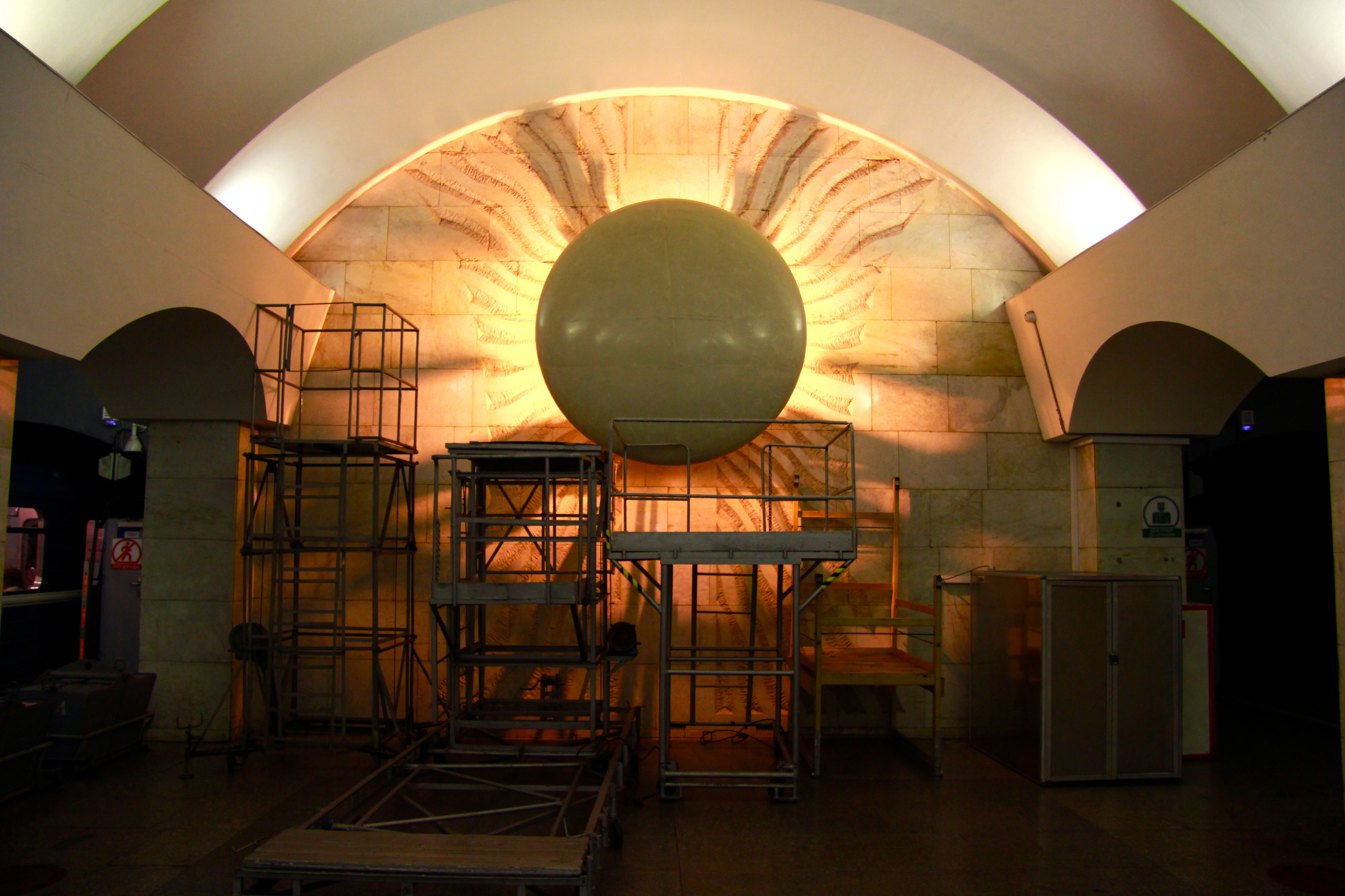
The illuminated “Sun” light composition on the end wall
