= Vyborg Side =

Northern and northeastern part of Saint Petersburg, Russia

Coordinates: 59°58′10″N 30°20′45″E

'The Vyborg Side (Russian: Выборгская сторона) is the traditional name of the northern and northeastern part of Saint Petersburg, Russia on the right-hand bank of the city's main waterway Neva and its first right-hand arm the Bolshaya Nevka. This large area was one of the five police administration parts of the city which were created under Peter I in 1718 and, shifting borders, existed until the February Revolution of 1917 that replaced them with rayony - districts of then Petrograd (the city's name in 1914–1924). The number and boundaries of districts varied throughout the 20 century. The Vyborg Side had previously been called Karelian Side and surrounded the old Swedish road to a then-major city of Vyborg from the Swedish town Nien and its fort located at the mouth of Okhta River, a tributary of the Neva. The Vyborg Side was divided into Vyborg District (Vyborgskiy rayon), Kalinin District (Kalininskiy rayon) and parts of Krasnogvardeyskiy District and Primorskiy District of Saint Petersburg. The active participation of its factory workers in the 1917 October Revolution was shown in a series of three feature films about a young revolutionary workman with the first name Maxim, including the eponymous Vyborgskaya storona - The Vyborg Side.

== Links ==
Documentary on YouTube.
