= Politekhnicheskaya (Saint Petersburg Metro) =

Saint Petersburg Metro Station

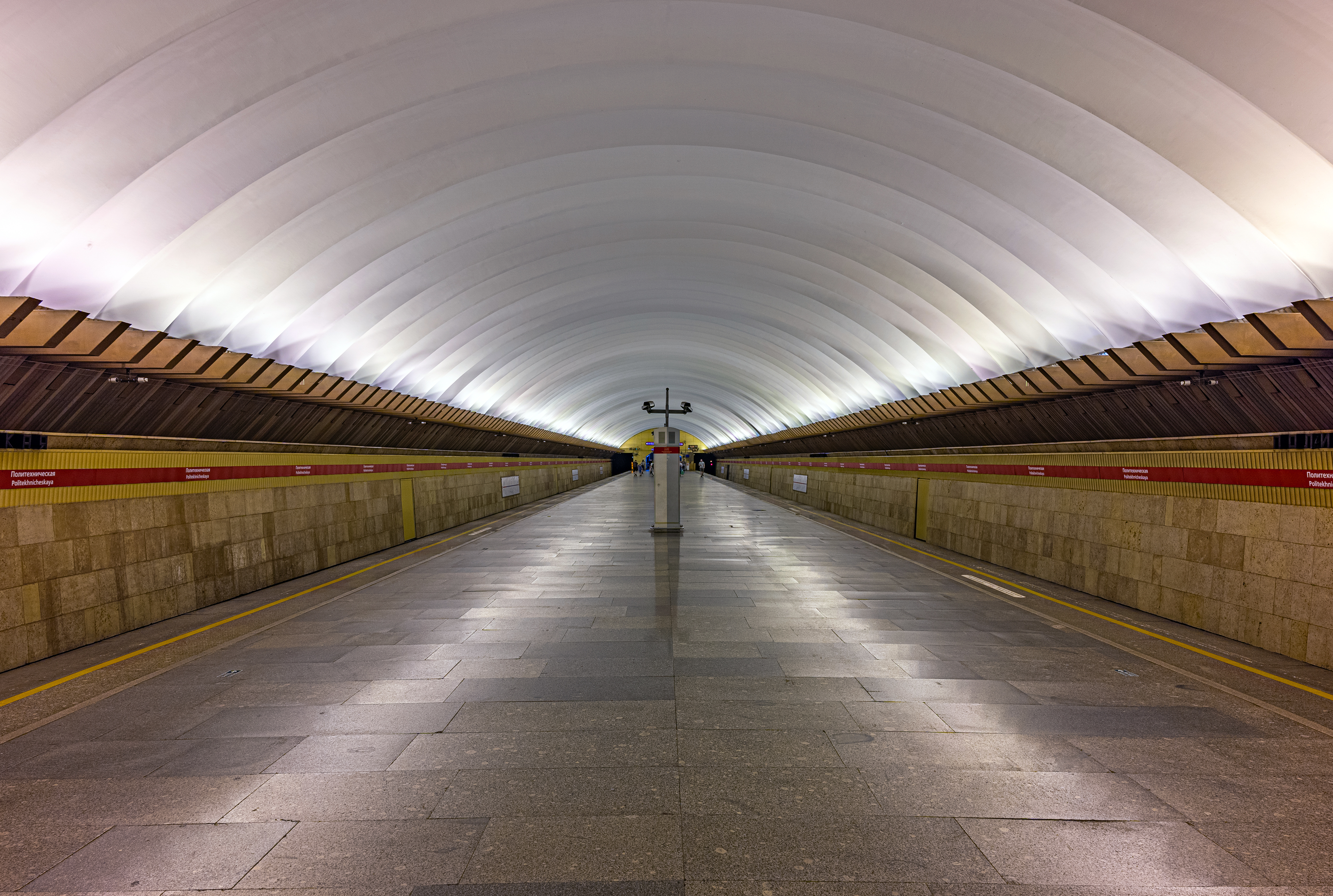
- Platform Hall

General information
- Location: Kalininsky District; Saint Petersburg; Russia
- Coordinates: 60°0′32.19″N 30°22′15.21″E
- System: Saint Petersburg Metro station
- Operator: Saint Petersburg Metro
- Line: Kirovsko–Vyborgskaya Line
- Platforms: 1 (Island platform)
- Tracks: 2
- Connections: Bus: 69, 94, 271, 275, 294, 399 Tram: 38, 40, 55, 57, 61 Trolleybus: 4, 21, 34, 50, 51

Construction
- Structure type: Underground
- Depth: 65 m (213 ft)
- Platform levels: 1
- Parking: Yes
- Cycle facilities: Yes

Other information
- Station code: ПТ

History
- Opened: December 31, 1975

Services
Preceding station	Saint Petersburg Metro	Following station
Akademicheskaya towards Devyatkino	Line 1	Ploschad Muzhestva towards Prospekt Veteranov
Route map
Location

Politekhnicheskaya (Russian: Политехни́ческая, lit. “Polytechnic”) is a station of the Saint Petersburg Metro. It is located on the Kirovsko-Vyborgskaya line and opened on December 31, 1975.

The station takes its name from the nearby St. Petersburg Polytechnic University campus.

Together with the adjacent Ploshchad Muzhestva station, it is one of the first single-vault deep-level stations in the world with an island platform.

== Surface vestibule ==
The station’s surface pavilion is located on Politekhnicheskaya Street near the Pokrovskaya Church. The upper vestibule is decorated with yellow metal and white marble, although the originally planned transparent glass cube structure was partially filled with decorative stone during construction.

== Underground section ==
The station features a gray granite floor and track walls that were originally faced with travertine. The original rectangular lighting fixtures on the cornice sloped inward toward the hall. However, the station lost its original architectural appearance after the lighting was replaced with orange sodium lamps in 2003, and the travertine was replaced with porcelain stoneware and painted panels during a 2009–10 renovation. The escalator tunnel, containing three escalators, is located at the southern end of the station; in 2016, its luminaires were changed from "light bollards" to "torches".

== Track development ==
North of the station, there are two branch tunnels without rails that end in dead ends about 20–30 meters from the main tracks. They are currently used as storage rooms by metro services. These tunnels were built as a provision for a possible future branch line to the town of Bugry, though its construction is not currently planned.
