= Russian State Scientific Center for Robotics and Technical Cybernetics =

Facility in Saint Petersburg, Russia

Coordinates: 60.0210°N 30.3706°E

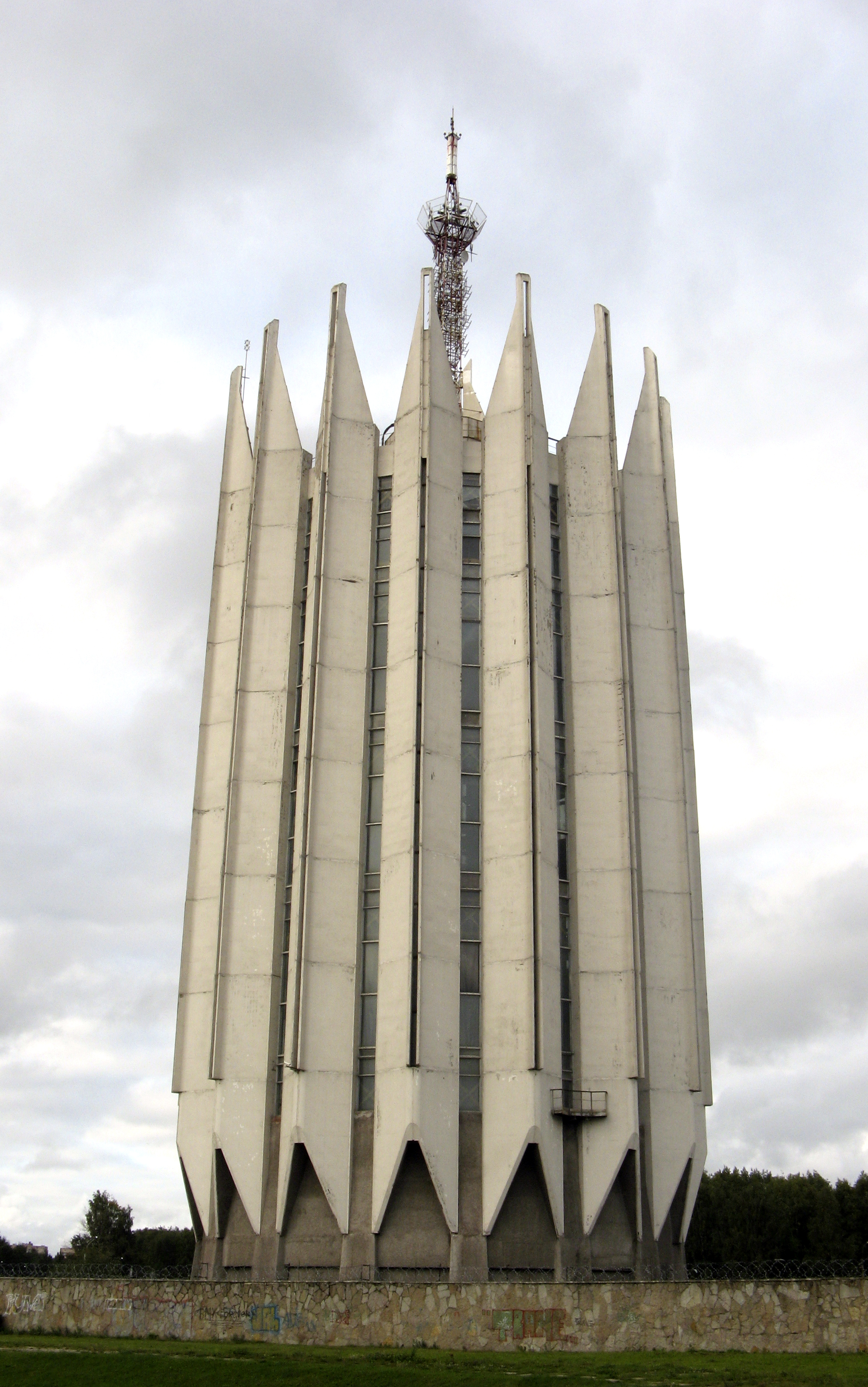
The laboratory tower of the Central Research Institute of the RTC in 2008

The Russian State Scientific Center for Robotics and Technical Cybernetics (RTC; Russian: ЦНИИ робототехники и технической кибернетики) is one of the leading research institutes in Russia. Located in St. Petersburg, it specializes in software and hardware development, and in robotics and technical cybernetics.

Special design bureau for technical cybernetics was formed on the base of Peter the Great St. Petersburg Polytechnic University on January 29, 1968. In June 1981, the bureau was transformed into the RTC.

RTC participated in the development of the soft landing control system for the spacecraft Soyuz and the robotic probe Luna 16. In 1986–1987, the institute created mobile robots for radiation reconnaissance and liquidation of Chernobyl accident consequences. In the early 1990s the institute participated in the development of the manipulator for the spacecraft Buran.
