= Ozerki (Saint Petersburg Metro) =

Saint Petersburg Metro Station

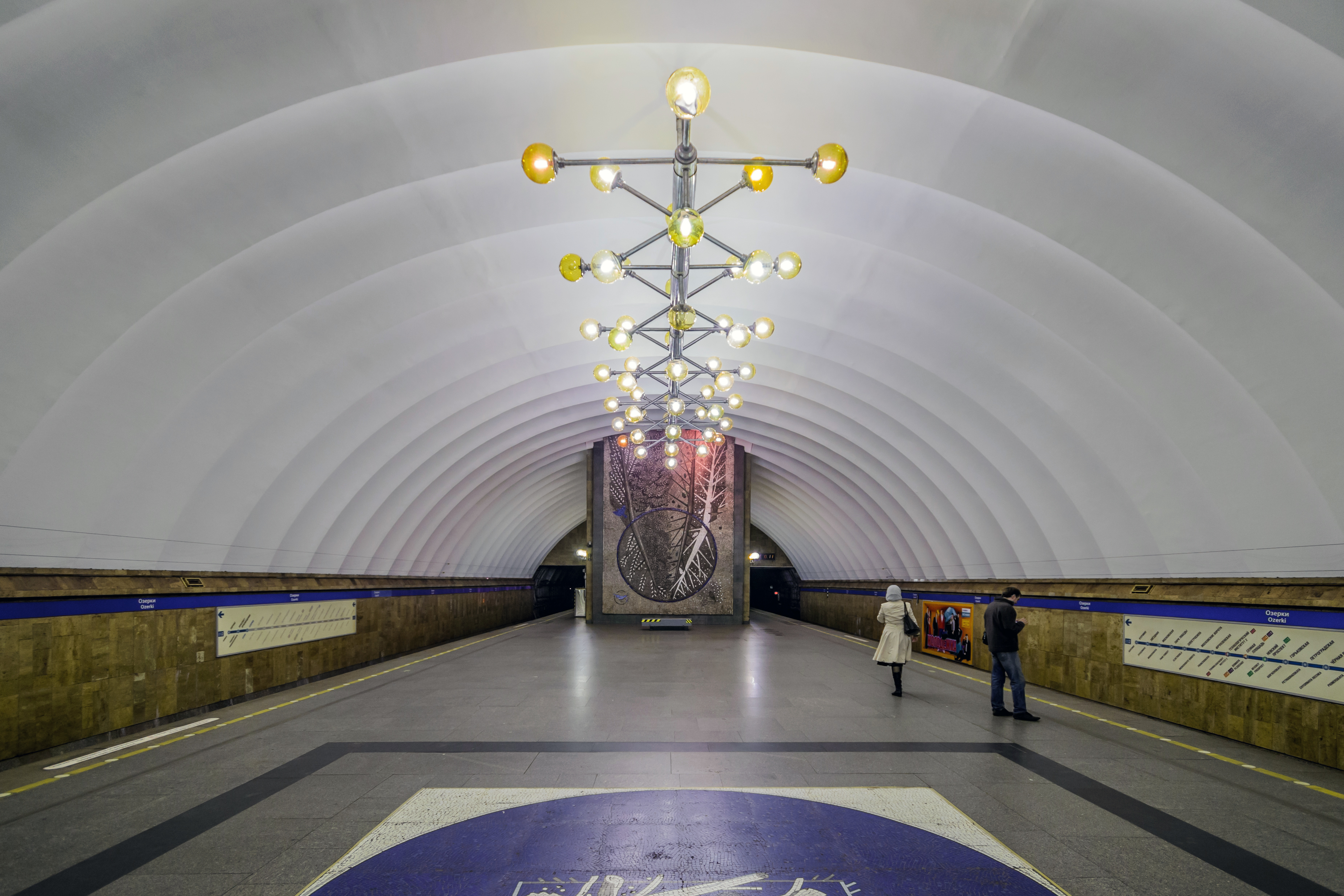
- Station Hall

General information
- Location: Vyborgsky District; Saint Petersburg; Russia
- Coordinates: 60°2′13.74″N 30°19′17.46″E
- System: Saint Petersburg Metro station
- Owner: Saint Petersburg Metro
- Line: Moskovsko–Petrogradskaya Line
- Platforms: 1 (Island platform)
- Tracks: 2

Construction
- Structure type: Underground

Other information
- Station code: 13

History
- Opened: 1988-08-19
- Electrified: Third rail

Services
Preceding station	Saint Petersburg Metro	Following station
Prospekt Prosvescheniya towards Parnas	Line 2	Udelnaya towards Kupchino
Route map
Location

Ozerki (Russian: Озерки́) is a station on line 2 of the Saint Petersburg Metro, within the Ozerki historic district. It opened on 19 August 1988, and is between Udelnaya and Prospekt Prosvescheniya stations.

It is a single-vault station, at a depth of 59 metres (194 ft). The underground hall is decorated with marble, granite and diabase in warm orange tones, and mosaic pictures on the theme of nature. Three escalators are at the northern end of the station.

== Gallery ==
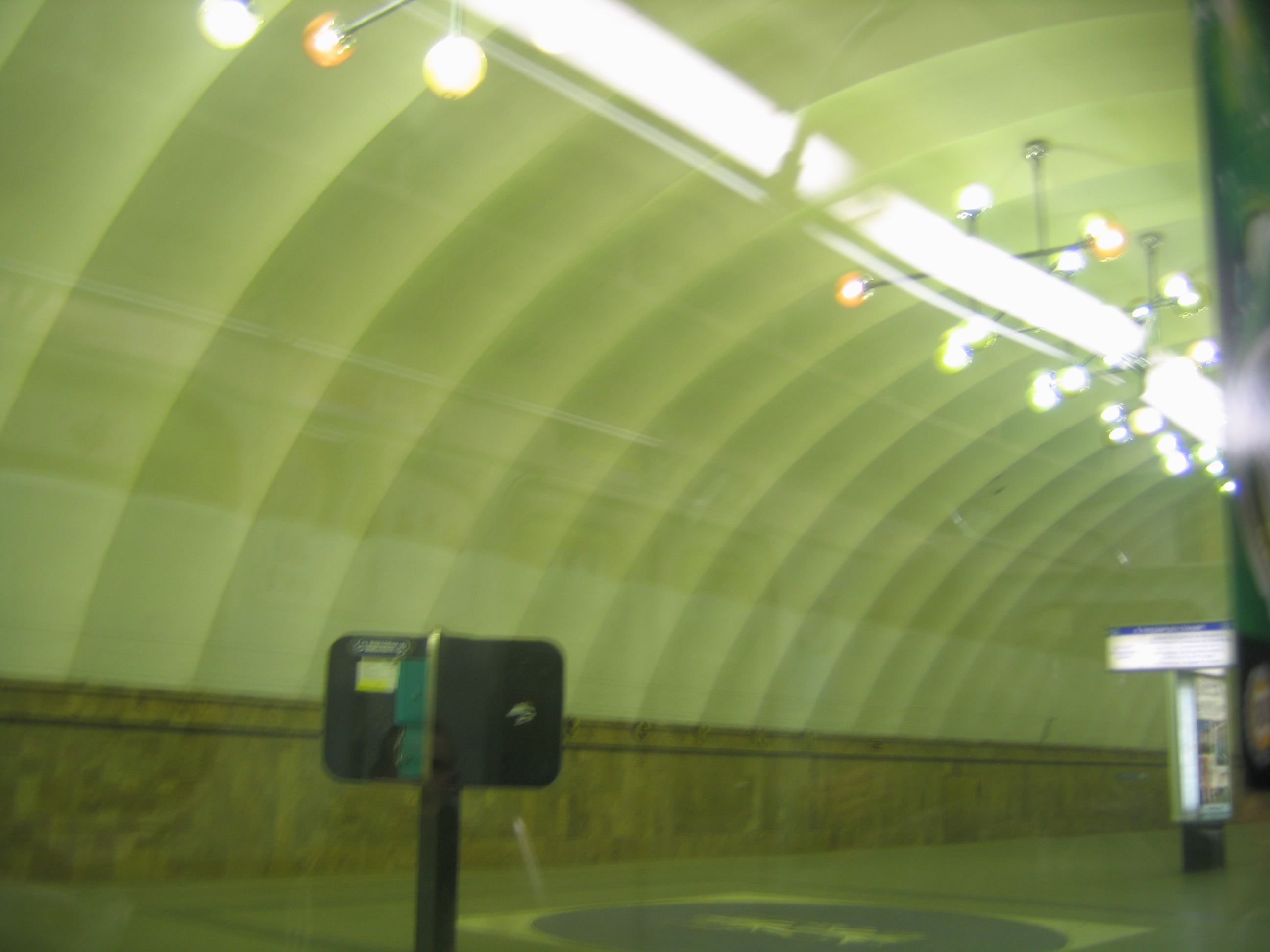
The view from the train window

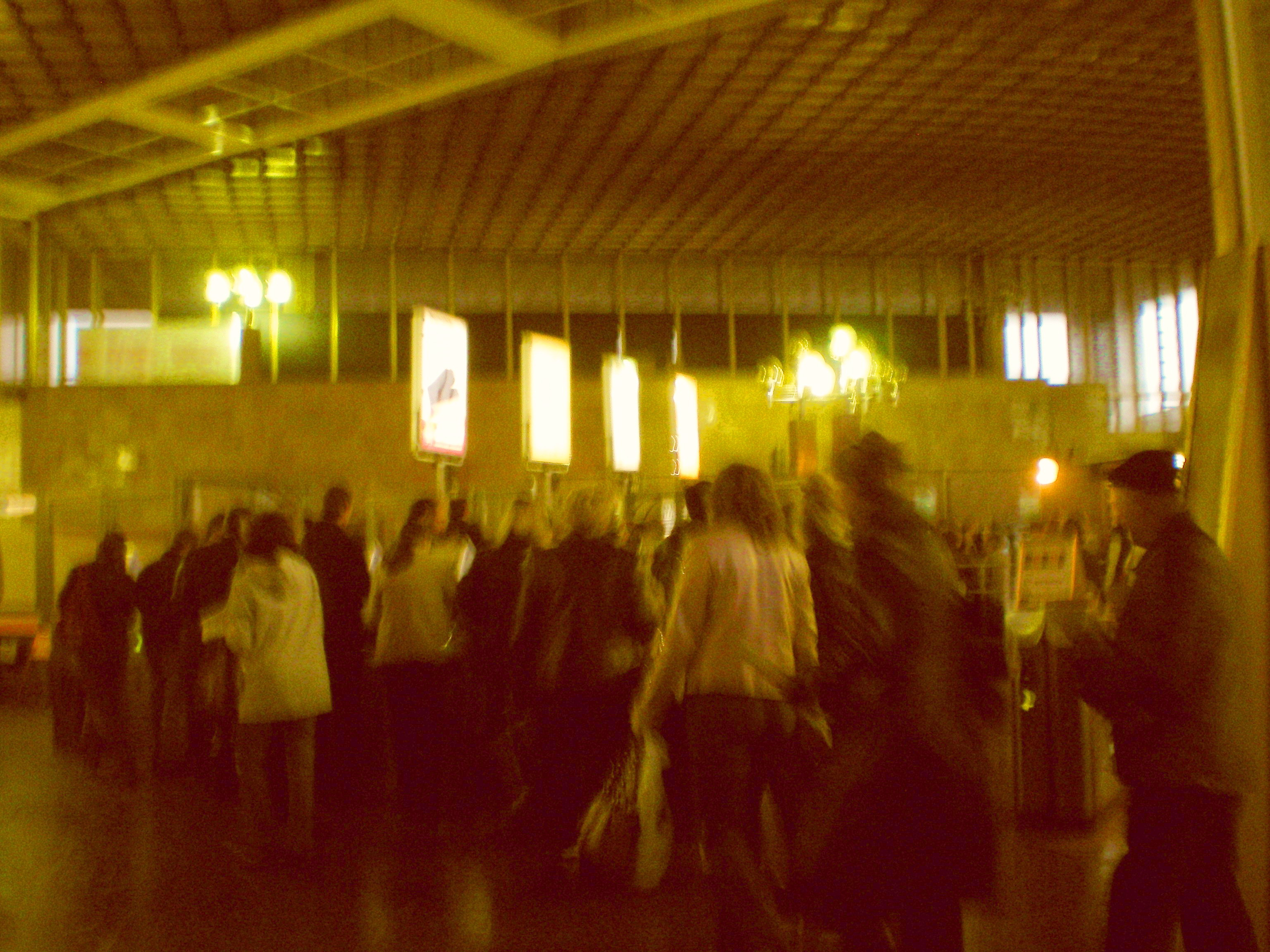
Interior ground lobby

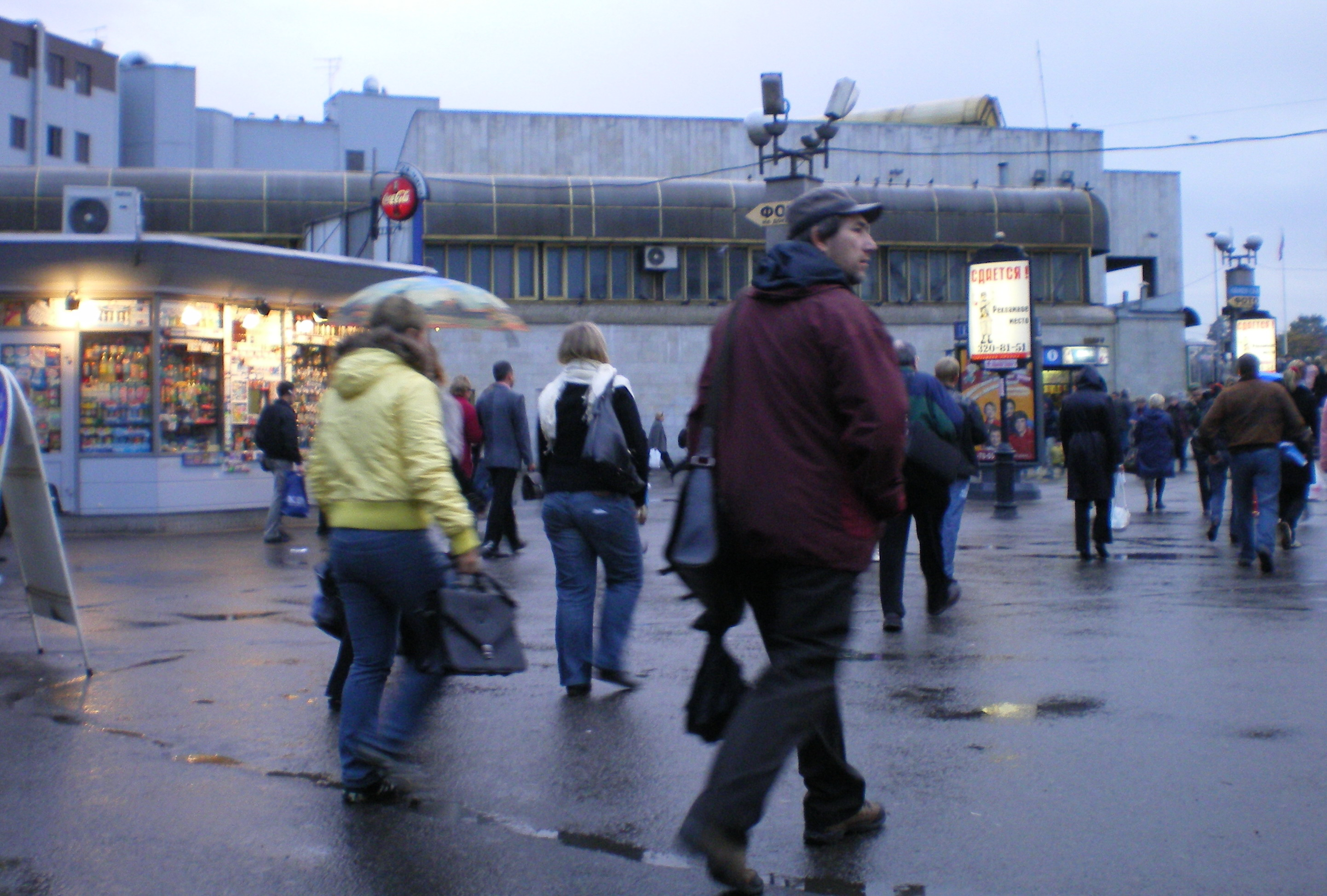
Exterior

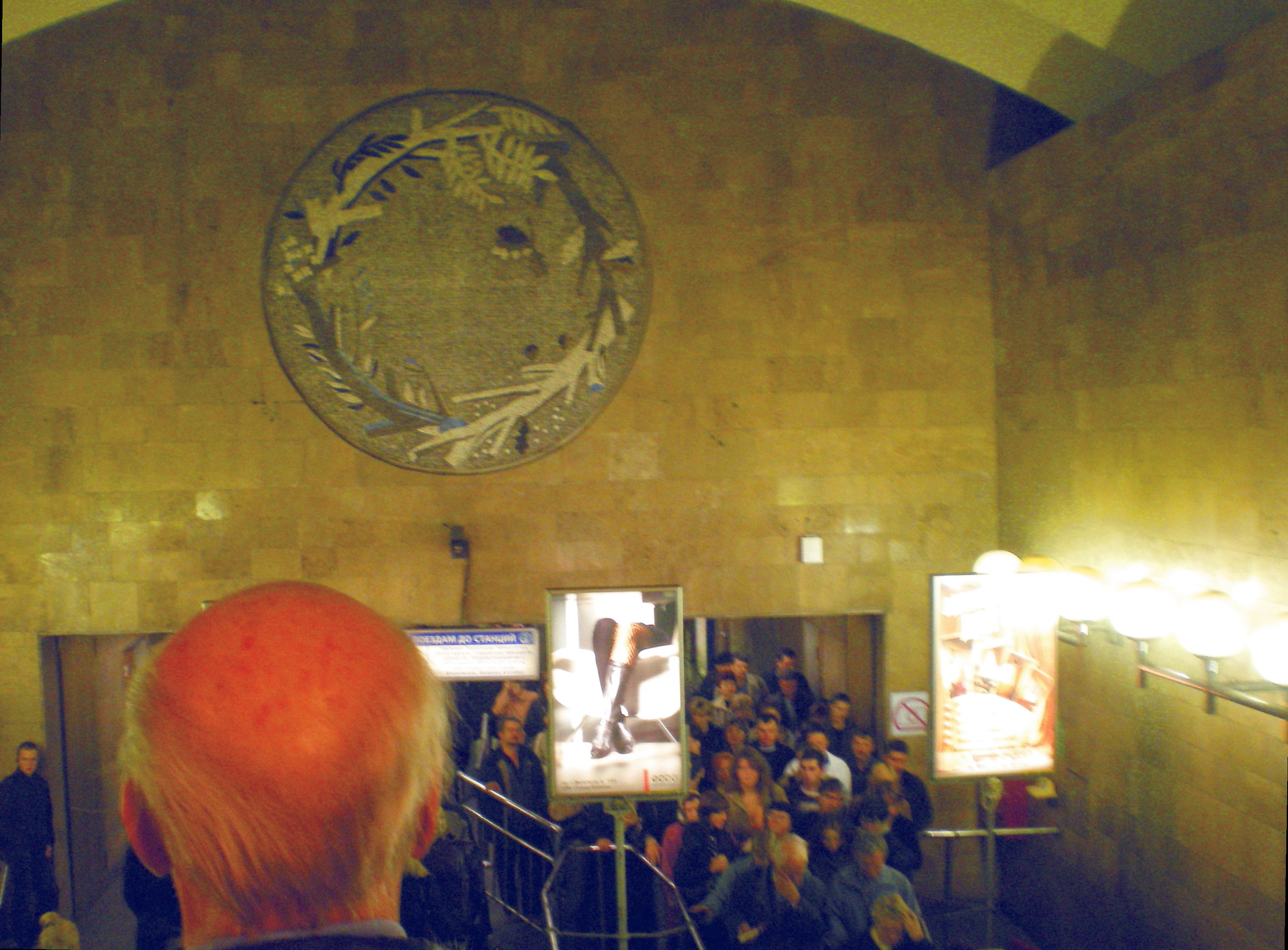
Lower escalator hall
