= Ozerki (Historic district in Saint Petersburg) =

- District
- Coordinates: 60°2′22.09″N 30°18′40.61″E
- Country: Russia
- Federal subject: Saint Petersburg

Ozerki (Russian: Озерки́ - "small lakes") is a historic district in the northern part of Saint Petersburg. It has been included in the city in 1963.

The district got its name from the Suzdal lakes which are located within its territory borders.

The district is currently a part of Shuvalovo-Ozerki municipal okrug within Vyborgsky District.

It is served by Ozerki metro station operating since 19 August 1988.

Oktyabrskay Railway station Ozerki is also located within the district.

== Historical events ==
Ozerki is a place where Georgy Gapon was murdered.

== See also ==
- Saint Petersburg City Administration

== Historical pictures ==
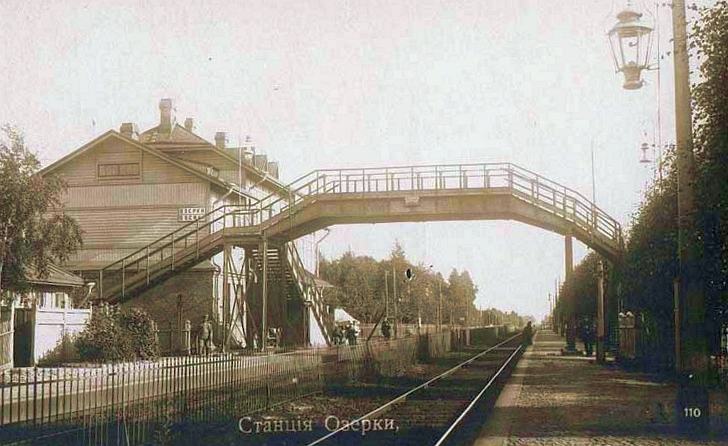
Ozerki railway station in the beginning of 20th century.

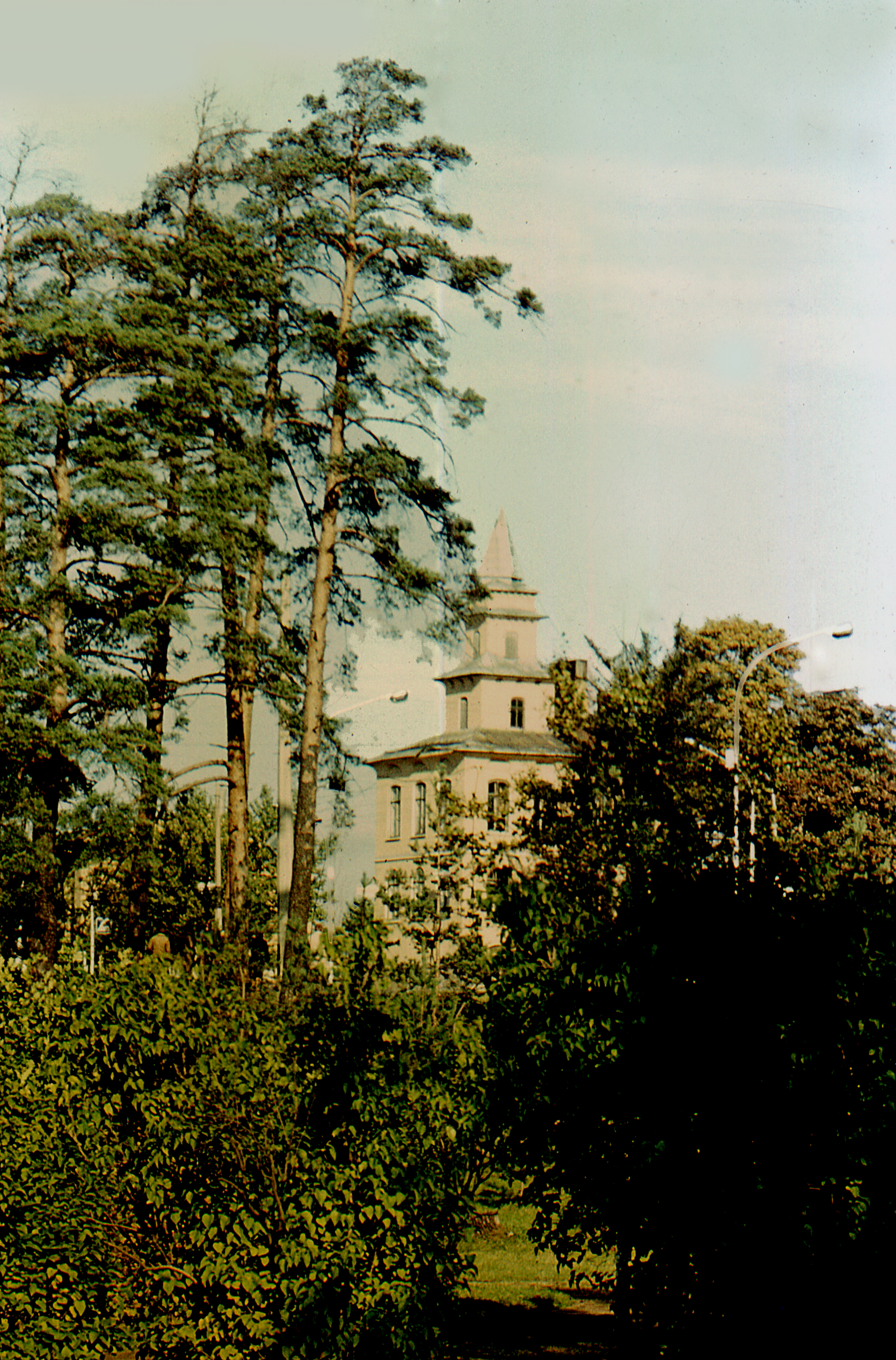
Badmaev house
