= Central Arc Thoroughfare =

Central Arc Thoroughfare (Rus. Центральная дуговая магистраль) in Saint Petersburg, Russia, is a semicircular (reverse C-shaped) chain of streets, designed to connect two motorways to and from the city and bypassing downtown through centers of mass residential areas built up from the 1960s.

The two motorways connect the city with local seaside towns along the coast of the Gulf of Finland, Primorskoye Shosse motorway going along the north shore towards the town of Primorsk not far from Finland, and Petergofskoye Shosse following the south coast through the town of Peterhof. The motorways start from the northwest (Primorskoye) and southwest (Petergofskoye) of the city respectively.

The Thoroughfare in its south often repeats the course of the frontline of the times of the 1941–44 Siege of Leningrad that divided Soviet troops from the troops of Nazi Germany and its satellite nations.
