= Piskaryovskoye Memorial Cemetery =

Cemetery in Saint Petersburg, Russia

- Пискарёвское мемориа́льное кла́дбище
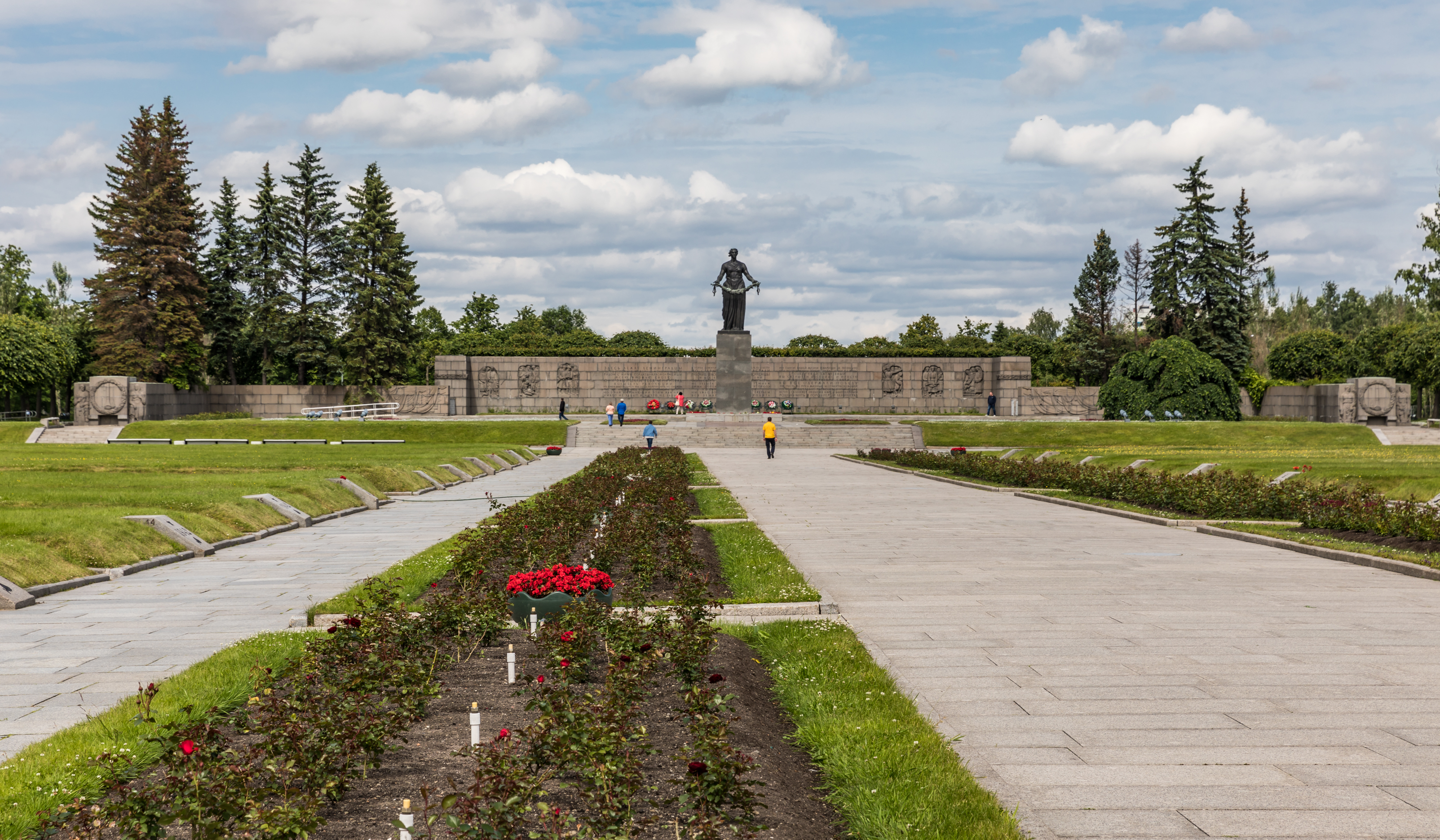
- Interactive map of Piskaryovskoye Memorial Cemetery

Details
- Established: 9 May 1960
- Location: Saint Petersburg
- Country: Russia
- Coordinates: 59.9969°N 30.4214°E

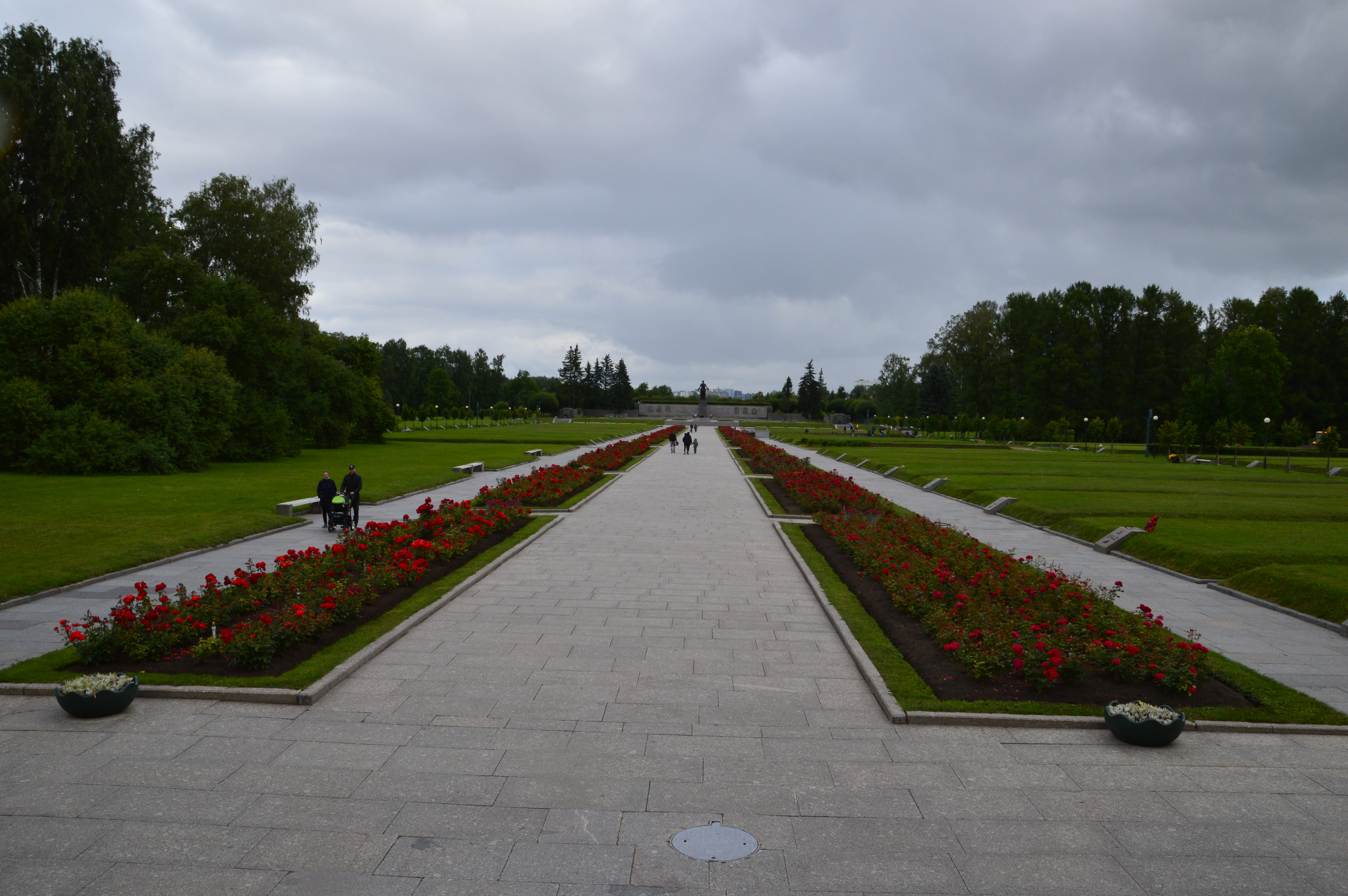
Central Area of the Piskaryovskoye Memorial Cemetery

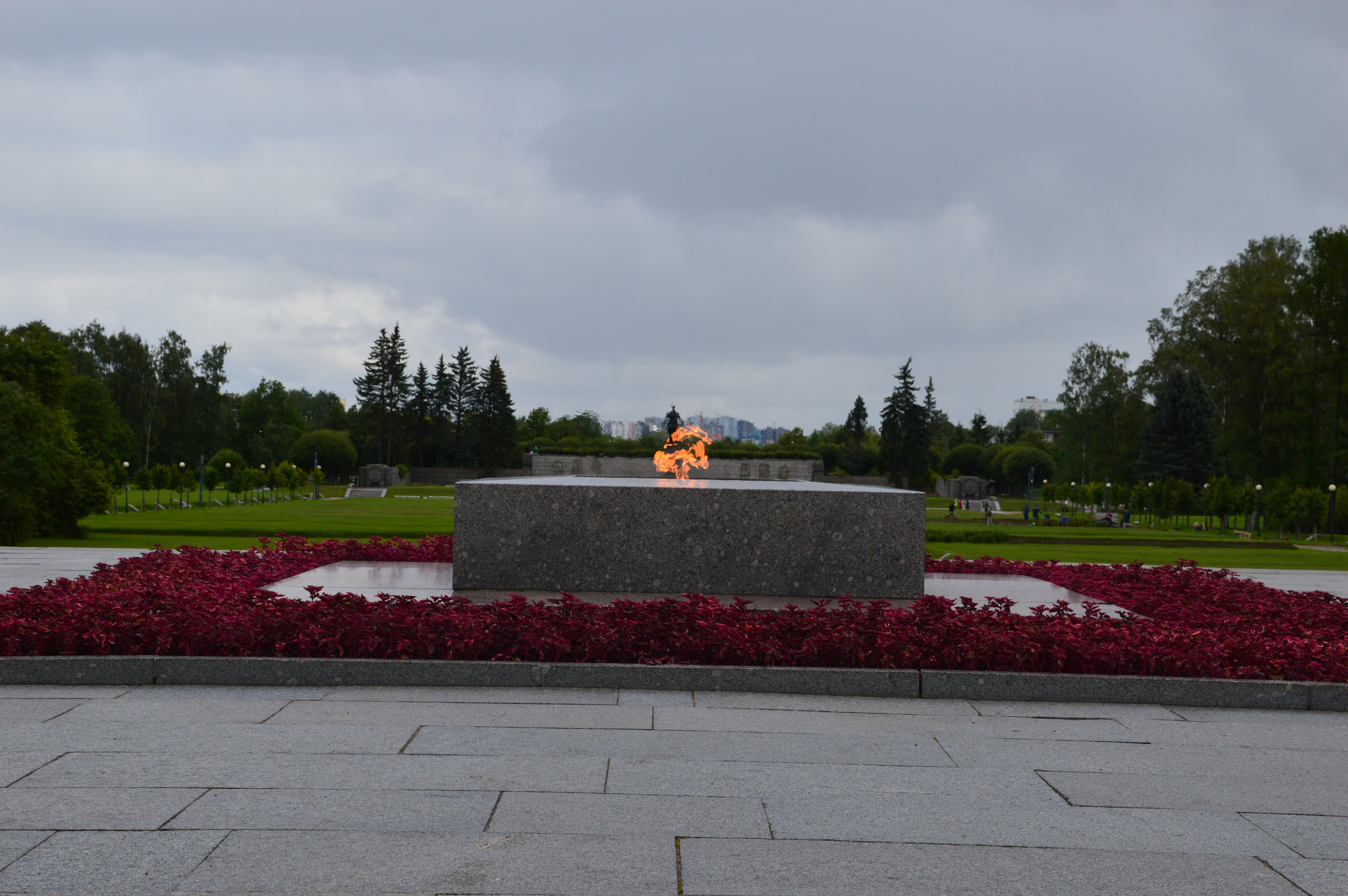
Eternal Flame at the Piskaryovskoye Memorial Cemetery

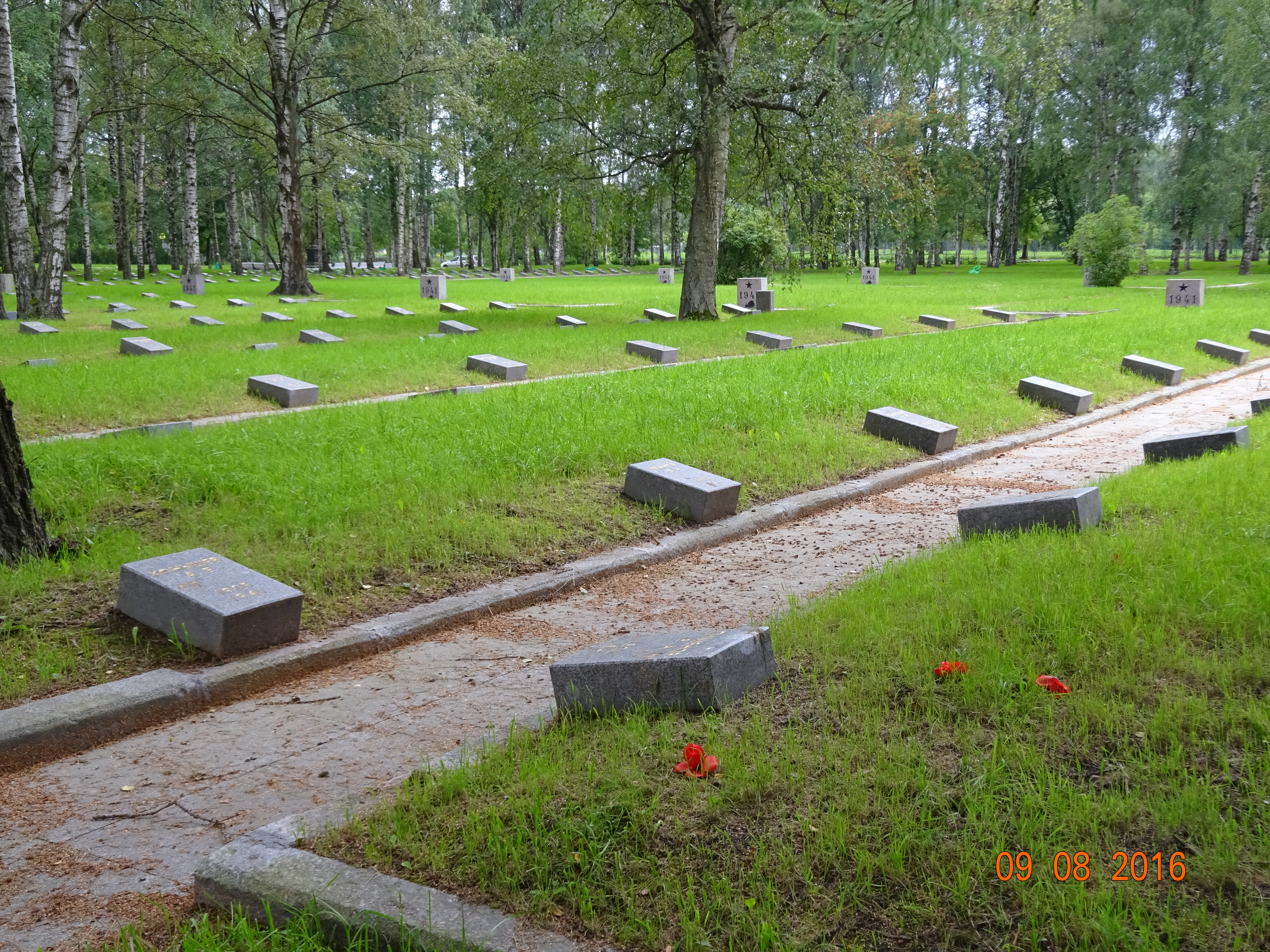
Graves at the Piskaryovskoye Memorial Cemetery

Piskaryovskoye Memorial Cemetery (Russian: Пискарёвское мемориа́льное кла́дбище) is located in Saint Petersburg, on the Avenue of the Unvanquished (Проспект Непокорённых), dedicated mostly to the victims of the siege of Leningrad. On his first visit to Russia in 1993, US President Bill Clinton laid a wreath in commemoration of the victims' deaths and the US-Russian alliance in World War II.

== Memorial complex ==
The memorial complex, designed by Alexander Vasiliev and Yevgeniy Levinson, was opened on May 9, 1960. About 420,000 civilians and 50,000 soldiers of the Leningrad Front were buried in 186 mass graves; each plot is marked only with the date of death (1941-1944). Near the entrance an eternal flame is located. A marble plate affirms that from September 4, 1941 to January 22, 1944 107,158 air bombs were dropped on the city, 148,478 shells were fired, 16,744 men died, 33,782 were wounded and 641,803 died of starvation.

The center of the architectural composition is the bronze monument symbolizing the Mother Motherland, by sculptors Vera Isaeva and Robert Taurit.

By granite steps leading down from the eternal flame visitors enter the main 480-meter path which leads to the majestic Motherland monument. The words of poet Olga Berggolts are carved on a granite wall located behind this monument:

Here lie Leningraders

Here are citydwellers – men, women, and children
And next to them, Red Army soldiers.
They defended you, Leningrad,
The cradle of the Revolution
With all their lives.
We cannot list their noble names here,
There are so many of them under the eternal protection of granite.
But know this, those who regard these stones:
No one is forgotten, nothing is forgotten.

Enemies, clad in armour and in iron, were bursting into the city,
But workers, schoolchildren, teachers and home guards stood up with the army
And like one, they all said
Death will sooner fear us, than we will fear death.
The hungry, harsh, dark winter of forty-one
And forty-two is not forgotten.
Neither the shells' ferocity
Nor the terror of bombardments in forty-three.
The entire city's earth was covered.

Not one of your lives, comrades, is forgot.
Under the uninterrupted fire from heaven, earth and water,
You did you everyday heroic deed
With honour, and simply.
And together with your Fatherland,
You all prevailed in victory.
So let the thankful people,
The Motherland and hero city Leningrad
Eternally lower their standards

On this sad and solemn meadow.
