= List of Saint Petersburg Metro stations =

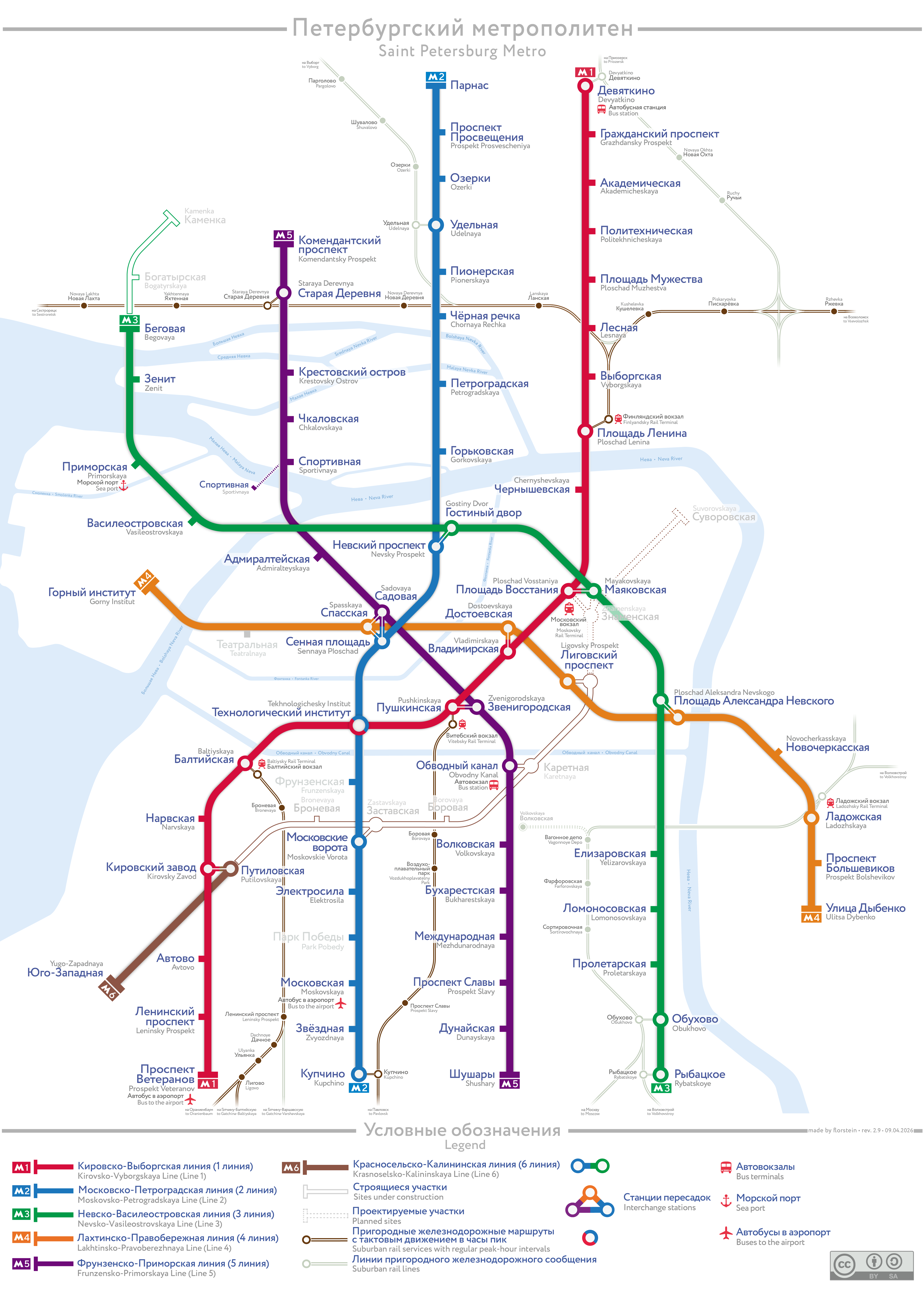
Lines of Saint Petersburg Metro

This is a list of Saint Petersburg Metro stations.

- The number sign ^{#} denotes the station provides cross-platform interchange design.
- "A" of the depth column denotes above ground station.

English	Russian	Line	Int.1	Int.2	Opening date	Depth (metre)	See also	Pic.
Devyatkino; Komsomolskaya (1978-1992)	Девяткино; Комсомольская (1978-1992)	M1			1978-12-29	A	Devyatkino Railway Station	Photo icon
Grazhdansky Prospekt	Гражданский проспект	M1			1978-12-29	64		Photo icon
Akademicheskaya	Академическая	M1			1975-12-31	64		Photo icon
Politekhnicheskaya	Политехническая	M1			1975-12-31	65	Polytechnical University	Photo icon
Ploschad Muzhestva	Площадь Мужества	M1			1975-12-31	67		Photo icon
Lesnaya	Лесная	M1			1975-04-22	64		Photo icon
Vyborgskaya	Выборгская	M1			1975-04-22	67	Vyborgsky District	Photo icon
Ploshchad Lenina	Площадь Ленина	M1			1958-06-01	71		Photo icon
Chernyshevskaya	Чернышевская	M1			1958-09-01	70	Nikolay Chernyshevsky	Photo icon
Ploshchad Vosstaniya	Площадь Восстания	M1	M3		1955-11-15	58	February Revolution	Photo icon
Vladimirskaya	Владимирская	M1	M4		1955-11-15	55	Vladimirskaya Church	Photo icon
Pushkinskaya	Пушкинская	M1	M5		1956-04-30	57	Alexander Pushkin	Photo icon
Tekhnologichesky Institut	Технологический институт	M1	M2#		1955-11-15	60	Institute of Technology	Photo icon
Baltiyskaya	Балтийская	M1			1955-11-15	57	Baltiysky Rail Terminal	Photo icon
Narvskaya	Нарвская	M1			1955-11-15	52	Narva Triumphal Arch	Photo icon
Kirovsky Zavod	Кировский завод	M1	M6		1955-11-15	50	Kirov Plant	Photo icon
Avtovo	Автово	M1			1955-11-15	12		Photo icon
Leninsky Prospekt	Ленинский проспект	M1			1977-09-29	08		Photo icon
Prospekt Veteranov	Проспект Ветеранов	M1			1977-09-29	08		Photo icon
Parnas	Парнас	M2			2006-12-22	A		Photo icon
Prospect Prosvesheniya	Проспект Просвещения	M2			1988-04-19	65		Photo icon
Ozerki	Озерки	M2			1988-04-19	59		Photo icon
Udelnaya	Удельная	M2			1982-11-04	64		Photo icon
Pionerskaya	Пионерская	M2			1982-11-04	67		Photo icon
Chyornaya Rechka	Чёрная речка	M2			1982-11-04	67		Photo icon
Petrogradskaya	Петроградская	M2			1963-07-01	53		Photo icon
Gorkovskaya	Горьковская	M2			1963-07-01	53	Maxim Gorky	Photo icon
Nevsky Prospekt	Невский проспект	M2	M3		1963-07-01	63		Photo icon
Sennaya Ploschad; Ploshchad Mira (1963-1992)	Сенная площадь Площадь Мира (1963-1992)	M2	M4	M5	1963-07-01	55		Photo icon
Tekhnologichesky Institut	Технологический институт	M2	M1#		1961-04-29	60		Photo icon
Frunzenskaya	Фрунзенская	M2			1961-04-29	39	Mikhail Frunze	Photo icon
Moskovskiye Vorota	Московские ворота	M2			1961-04-29	35	Moscow Triumphal Gate	Photo icon
Elektrosila	Электросила	M2			1961-04-29	35	Power Machines	Photo icon
Park Pobedy	Парк Победы	M2			1961-04-29	35		Photo icon
Moskovskaya	Московская	M2			1969-12-25	29	Moscow Avenue; Shuttle bus to Pulkovo Airport	Photo icon
Zvyozdnaya	Звёздная	M2			1972-12-25	22		Photo icon
Kupchino	Купчино	M2			1972-12-25	A		Photo icon
Begovaya	Беговая	M3			2018-05-26	20		Photo icon
Zenit; Novokrestovskaya (2018-2020)	Зенит; Новокрестовская (2018-2020)	M3			2018-05-26	23	Gazprom Arena	Photo icon
Primorskaya	Приморская	M3			1979-09-28	71		Photo icon
Vasileostrovskaya	Василеостровская	M3			1967-11-03	64	Vasilyevsky Island	Photo icon
Gostiny Dvor	Гостиный двор	M3	M2		1967-11-03	56		Photo icon
Mayakovskaya	Маяковская	M3	M1		1967-11-03	51	Vladimir Mayakovsky	Photo icon
Ploshchad Alexandra Nevskogo I	Площадь Александра; Невского-1	M3	M4		1967-11-03	54	Alexander Nevsky	Photo icon
Yelizarovskaya	Елизаровская	M3			1970-12-21	62		Photo icon
Lomonosovskaya	Ломоносовская	M3			1970-12-21	65		Photo icon
Proletarskaya	Пролетарская	M3			1981-07-10	72	Proletariat	Photo icon
Obukhovo	Обухово	M3			1981-07-10	62		Photo icon
Rybatskoye	Рыбацкое	M3			1984-12-28	A		Photo icon
Gorny Institut	Горный институт	M4			2024-27-12	71		Photo icon
Spasskaya	Спасская	M4	M2	M5	2009-03-07	60		Photo icon
Dostoevskaya	Достоевская	M4	M1		1991-12-30	62	Fyodor Dostoyevsky	Photo icon
Ligovsky Prospekt	Лиговский проспект	M4			1991-12-30	66		Photo icon
Ploshchad Alexandra Nevskogo II	Площадь Александра; Невского-2	M4	M3		1985-12-30	60		Photo icon
Novocherkasskaya; Krasnogvardeyskaya (1985-1992)	Новочеркасская; Красногвардейская (1985-1992)	M4			1985-12-30	61		Photo icon
Ladozhskaya	Ладожская	M4			1985-12-30	61	Ladozhsky Rail Terminal	Photo icon
Prospekt Bolshevikov	Проспект Большевиков	M4			1985-12-30	68	Bolshevik	Photo icon
Ulitsa Dybenko	Улица Дыбенко	M4			1987-10-01	61		Photo icon
Komendantsky Prospekt	Комендантский проспект	M5			2005-04-02	75		Photo icon
Staraya Derevnya	Старая Деревня	M5			1999-01-14	61		Photo icon
Krestovsky Ostrov	Крестовский остров	M5			1999-09-03	49	Krestovsky Island	Photo icon
Chkalovskaya	Чкаловская	M5			1997-09-15	60	Valery Chkalov	Photo icon
Sportivnaya	Спортивная	M5			1997-09-15	64		Photo icon
Admiralteyskaya	Адмиралтейская	M5			2011-12-28	86	Admiralteysky District	Photo icon
Sadovaya	Садовая	M5	M2	M4	1991-12-30	71		Photo icon
Zvenigorodskaya	Звенигородская	M5	M1		2008-12-20	57	Zvenigorod	Photo icon
Obvodny Kanal	Обводный канал	M5			2010-12-30	61		Photo icon
Volkovskaya	Волковская	M5			2008-12-20	61		Photo icon
Bukharestskaya	Бухарестская	M5			2012-12-28	65		Photo icon
Mezhdunarodnaya	Международная	M5			2012-12-28	65		Photo link
Prospekt Slavy	Проспект Славы	M5			2019-10-03	59		Photo link
Dunayskaya	Дунайская	M5			2019-10-03	17		Photo link
Shushary	Шушары	M5			2019-10-03	A		Photo link
Putilovskaya	Путиловская	M6	M1		2025-12-26	58		Photo icon
Yugo-Zapadnaya	Юго-Западная	M6			2025-12-26	56		Photo link
