= Nevsky Prospekt (Saint Petersburg Metro) =

Saint Petersburg Metro Station

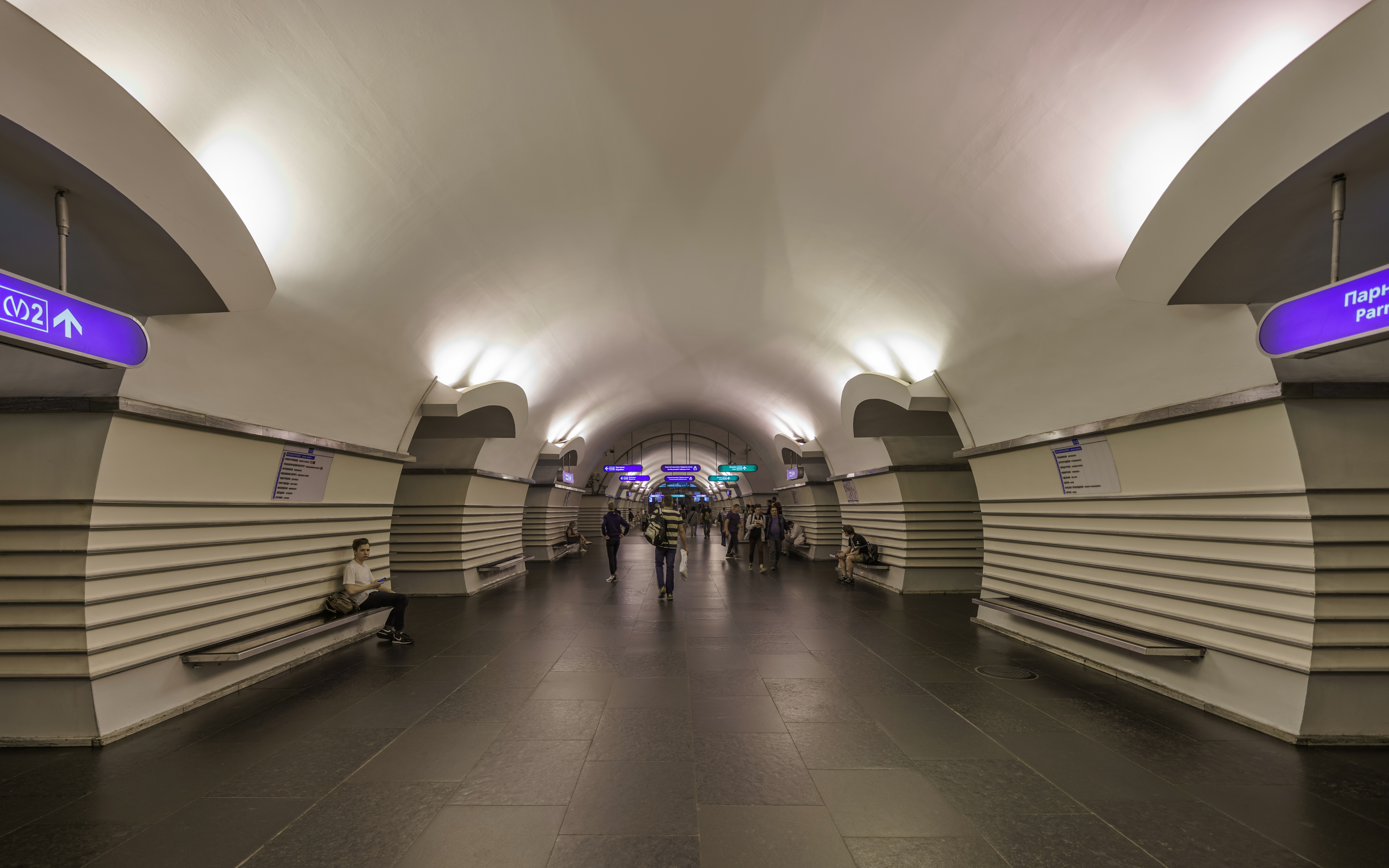
- Station Hall

General information
- Location: Tsentralny District; Saint Petersburg; Russia
- Coordinates: 59°56′06″N 30°19′42″E
- System: Saint Petersburg Metro station
- Owner: Saint Petersburg Metro
- Line: Moskovsko–Petrogradskaya Line
- Platforms: 1 (Island platform)
- Tracks: 2

Construction
- Structure type: Underground

History
- Opened: 1963-07-01
- Electrified: Third rail

Services
Preceding station	Saint Petersburg Metro	Following station
Gorkovskaya towards Parnas	Line 2	Sennaya Ploshchad towards Kupchino
Vasileostrovskaya towards Begovaya	Line 3 transfer at Gostiny Dvor	Mayakovskaya towards Rybatskoye
Route map
Location

Nevsky Prospekt (Russian: Не́вский проспе́кт) is a station on the Moskovsko-Petrogradskaya Line of the Saint Petersburg Metro. It serves the street of the same name, one of the largest in the city.

The station was opened on July 1, 1963. While the station itself was designed by Mayofis and Maximov, the interior was designed by Getskin, Shuvalova and Andreyev. The station has two sets of exits on Mikhailovskya Street.

The station is linked to Gostiny Dvor via a transfer corridor that descends to the middle of the platform and a set of escalators at the platform's northern end.

Nevsky Prospekt is considered one of the most congested stations in the entire Saint Petersburg Metro.

Nevsky Prospekt is one of the more exotic locations used in Mornington Crescent, a game played in the BBC Radio 4 show I'm Sorry I Haven't a Clue.
