= Pavel Shuvalov =

Soviet-Russian serial killer

- Born: Pavel Alekseyevich Shuvalov; 1 March 1968; Leningrad, RSFSR
- Died: 11 March 2021 (aged 53); Mordovian Zone, Sosnovka, Mordovia, Russia
- Other name: "Nevsky Forest Park Maniac"
- Conviction: Murder
- Penalty: Death; commuted to life imprisonment

Details
- Victims: 3
- Span of crimes: 1991–1995
- Country: Soviet Union, later Russia
- State: St. Petersburg
- Date apprehended: 22 December 1995

Pavel Alekseyevich Shuvalov (Russian: Па́вел Алексе́евич Шува́лов; 1 March 1968 – 11 March 2021), known as the Nevsky Forest Park Maniac (Russian: Маньяк из Невского лесопарка), was a Soviet-Russian serial killer who killed 3 children between 1991 and 1995.

== Biography ==
Shuvalov was born in 1968 in Leningrad in a well-to-do Soviet family. He was the youngest child, and as such, his parents indulged in any of his whims. Shuvalov spent most of his free time at home, almost never communicating with his peers. As he later said, at the age of 12, his classmates for him the so-called "dark", severely beating him and, at the same time, cutting his pantyhose into the crotch and pulling it on his head. Subsequently, Shuvalov would treat his victims almost the same way.

After school Shuvalov served in the army, then began work for the Ministry of Internal Affairs, serving in the Leningrad Metro Directorate at the stations Yelizarovskaya, Lomonosovskaya, Proletarskaya and Obukhovo, as well as in the Nevsky and Severnoye depots. By the early 1990s, he had risen to the rank of senior sergeant.

== Murders ==
Shuvalov detained underage girls who tried to get into the metro station without a ticket, bypassing the turnstile. Taking them to the interrogation room, he threatened to report the offence to the school and parents, intimidating and then extorting consent to a meeting outside of working hours. The murders took place during such meetings, in the Nevsky Forest Park, only killing girls in pantyhoses. In the forest park, he forced the victims to wear the pantyhose they had brought with them, then raped them. According to experts, Shuvalov was a typical heterosexual maniac-fetishist. His first murder was committed in the fall of 1991, the body being discovered by park employees only two months later. He raped and then drowned 12-year-old Irina Barsukova, managing to evade capture as her death was considered an accident. Over the next four years, Shuvalov committed two more murders.

== Arrest and trial ==
Despite the fact that Shuvalov always destroyed evidence at the crime scene, he was always considered a suspect. The acquaintances of some victims said that an unknown policeman for various reasons (most often for attempting to get a free ride) assigned the missing girls meetings to pay a fine or simply read the morals. Further investigation read to Shuvalov. Trying to collect evidence, the detectives decided to take a risk - they used a girl as bait, but the killer let her go at the last moment and the operation failed. After some time the investigators decided to interrogate Shuvalov as a witness, but before they could ask any questions, he suddenly admitted to everything, despite the fact that all the evidence was indirect.

On 11 June 1997, the Leningrad Regional Court sentenced Pavel Shuvalov to death. His last words in court were the following:

I want to say only one thing, when passing this verdict, now, you are not pronouncing the verdict on me, but on the entire structure of the Ministry of Internal Affairs, because a police officer can never be a maniac...

Shuvalov, even after the sentencing, continued to rely on a pardon and wrote cassation complaints, but the verdict remained unchanged for a while before eventually being replaced with life imprisonment. He died in prison in 2021. Pavel Shuvalov was serving his sentence in the "Mordovian Zone" prison in the village of Sosnovka in Mordovia.

== In the media ==
- Newsreel "Outside the Law", 1998.
- Documentary film "The Secret of the Nevsky Forest Park" from series "Criminal Russia" (NTV, 1998 год).
- Documentary film "Hunting for the Werewolf" from the series "Miltia Stories" (since 16 July 2016 this documentary cycle is called "Law is the Law").
- Episode "Sheep's Skin", from the TV series "Secrets of Investigation-3".
- Episode "Forester", from the TV series "The Murderer's Profile".
- Episode "Maniac, which could not be." from the TV series "The composition of the crime". Actor Aleksandr Zherebko plays the role of Shuvalov.
- The film "Steel Butterfly" is based on Shuvalov's story.
- A song about Shuvalov was written by Russian rap artist "Glory of the CPSU".

== See also ==
- Alexander Sergeychik
- List of Russian serial killers
