= Ploshchad Vosstaniya (Saint Petersburg Metro) =

Saint Petersburg Metro St

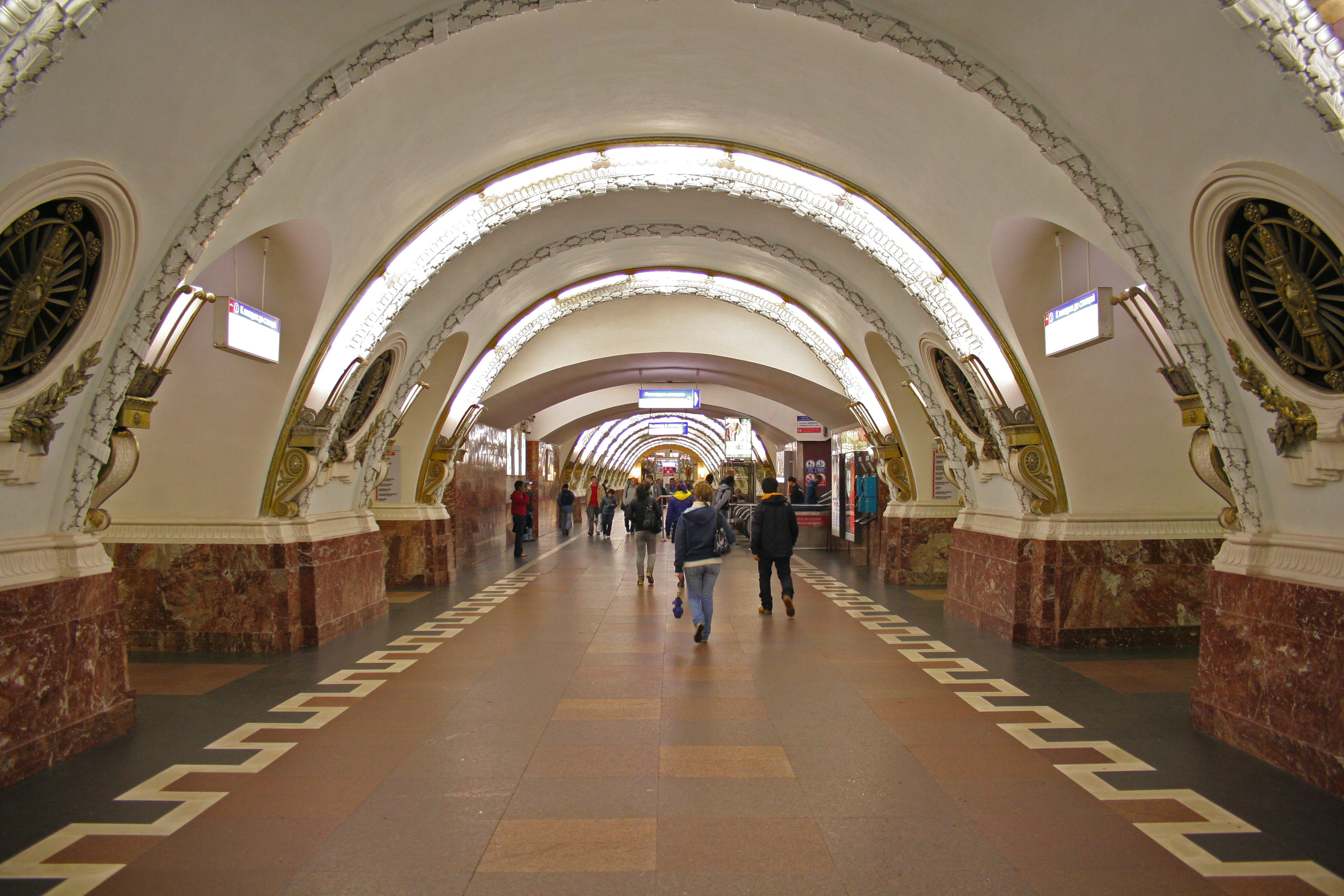
- Central hall

General information
- Location: Tsentralny District; Saint Petersburg; Russia
- Coordinates: 59.9316°N 30.3605°E
- System: Saint Petersburg Metro station
- Owner: Saint Petersburg Metro
- Line: Kirovsko–Vyborgskaya Line
- Platforms: 1
- Tracks: 2

Construction
- Structure type: Underground
- Depth: 58 m (190 ft)

History
- Opened: November 15, 1955
- Electrified: Third rail

Services
Preceding station	Saint Petersburg Metro	Following station
Chernyshevskaya towards Devyatkino	Line 1	Vladimirskaya towards Prospekt Veteranov
Gostiny Dvor towards Begovaya	Line 3 transfer at Mayakovskaya	Ploshchad Alexandra Nevskogo I towards Rybatskoye
Route map
Location

Ploshchad Vosstaniya (Russian: Плóщадь Восстáния, IPA: [ˈploɕːɪtʲ vɐsːˈtanʲɪjə], lit. 'Uprising Square') is a station on the Kirovsko-Vyborgskaya Line of Saint Petersburg Metro. It is one of the system's original stations, opening on November 15, 1955. It is a deep underground Pylon station at 58 metres (190 ft) depth. The main surface vestibule is situated on Vosstaniya Square, which gives its name to the station. Another exit (opened in 1960) opens directly into the Moskovsky Rail Terminal. Ploshchad Vosstaniya is connected to the station Mayakovskaya of the Nevsko-Vasileostrovskaya Line via a transfer corridor and a set of escalators.

== Gallery ==
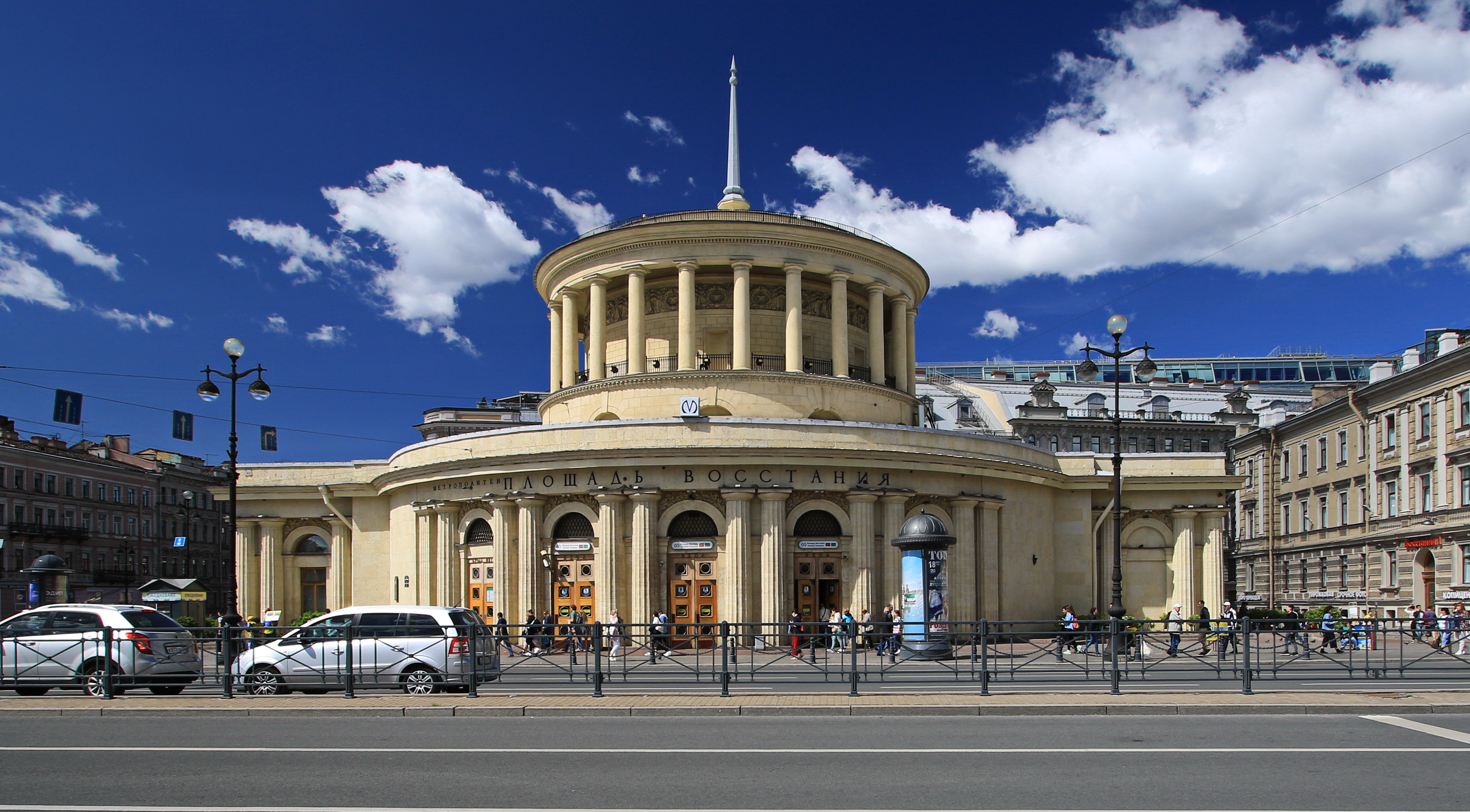
The main entrance at night, viewed from Vosstaniya Square
