= Mayakovskaya (Saint Petersburg Metro) =

Saint Petersburg Metro Station

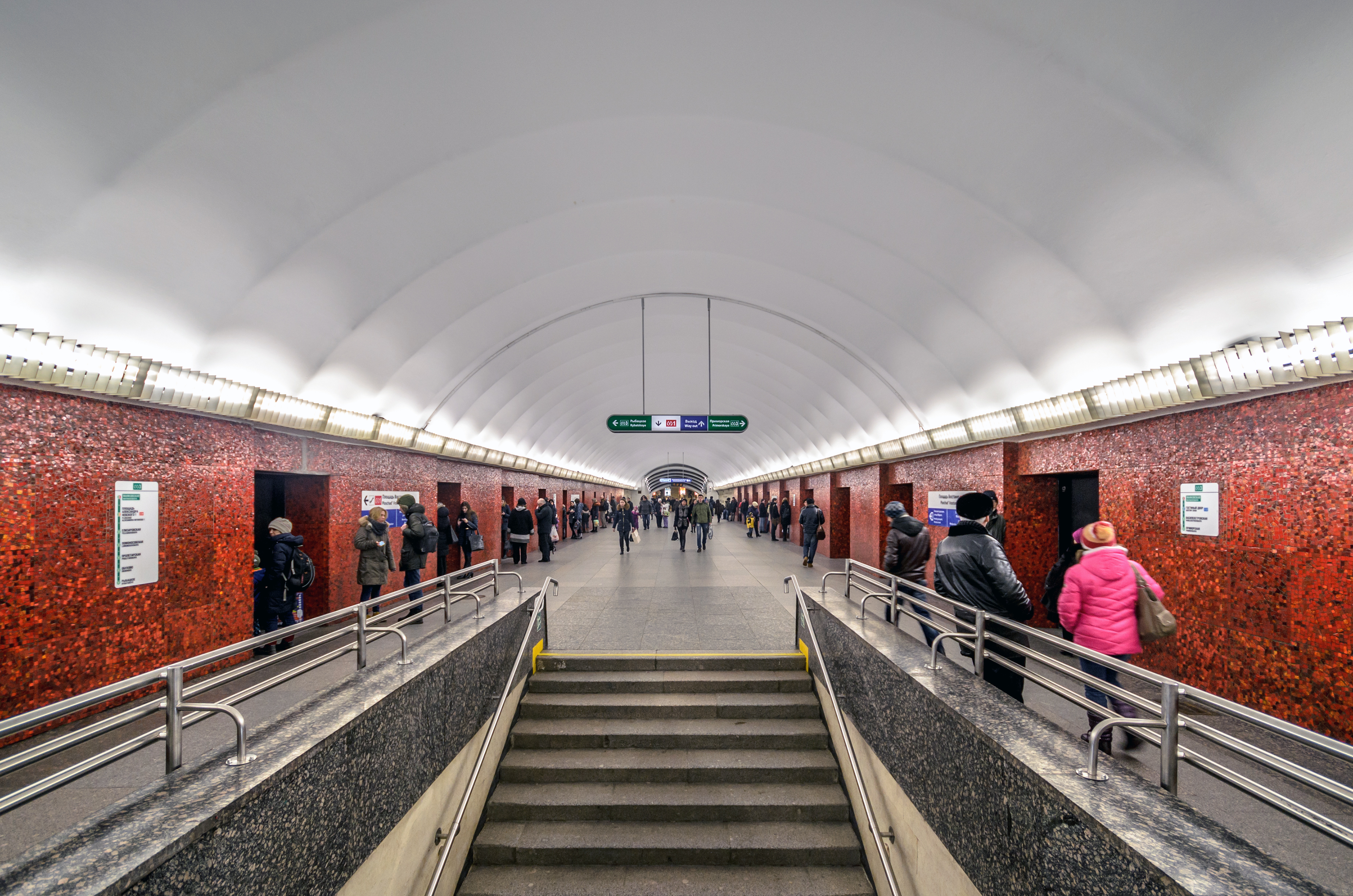
- Station Hall

General information
- Location: Tsentralny District; Saint Petersburg; Russia
- Coordinates: 59.9315°N 30.3549°E
- System: Saint Petersburg Metro station
- Owner: Saint Petersburg Metro
- Line: Nevsko–Vasileostrovskaya Line
- Platforms: 1 (Island platform)
- Tracks: 2

Construction
- Structure type: Underground
- Depth: ≈51 m (167 ft)

History
- Opened: November 3, 1967
- Electrified: Third rail

Services
Preceding station	Saint Petersburg Metro	Following station
Gostiny Dvor towards Begovaya	Line 3	Ploshchad Alexandra Nevskogo I towards Rybatskoye
Chernyshevskaya towards Devyatkino	Line 1 transfer at Ploshchad Vosstaniya	Vladimirskaya towards Prospekt Veteranov
Route map
Location

Mayakovskaya (Russian: Маяко́вская) is a station on the Nevsko–Vasileostrovskaya Line of Saint Petersburg Metro, opened on November 3, 1967, and named after Russian poet Vladimir Mayakovsky. The main surface vestibule is situated on Nevsky Prospekt. Mayakovskaya is connected to the station Ploshchad Vosstaniya of the Kirovsko-Vyborgskaya Line via a transfer corridor and a set of escalators. The transfer corridor also links both stations to Moskovsky Rail Terminal.
