= Yelizarovskaya (Saint Petersburg Metro) =

Saint Petersburg Metro Station

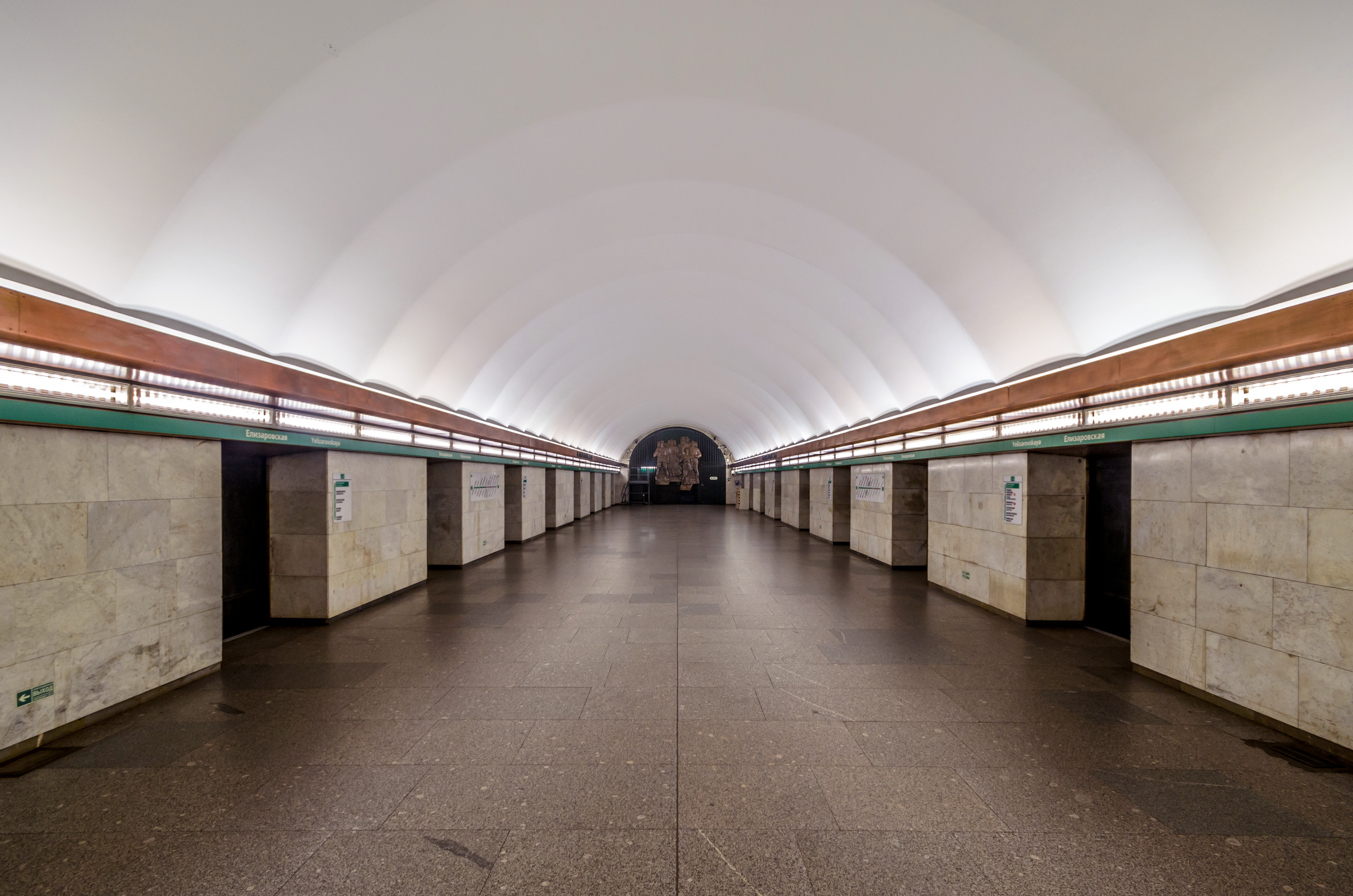
- Station Hall

General information
- Location: Nevsky District; Saint Petersburg; Russia
- Coordinates: 59.8967°N 30.4235°E
- System: Saint Petersburg Metro station
- Owner: Saint Petersburg Metro
- Line: Nevsko–Vasileostrovskaya Line
- Platforms: 1 (Island platform)
- Tracks: 2

Construction
- Structure type: Underground
- Depth: ≈62 m (203 ft)

History
- Opened: December 21, 1970
- Electrified: Third rail

Services
Preceding station	Saint Petersburg Metro	Following station
Ploshchad Alexandra Nevskogo I towards Begovaya	Line 3	Lomonosovskaya towards Rybatskoye
Route map
Location

Yelizarovskaya (Russian: Елиза́ровская) is a station on the Nevsko–Vasileostrovskaya Line of Saint Petersburg Metro (formerly Leningrad Metro), opened on December 21, 1970.

== History ==
During design stage in 1960s, the station was originally named after the station location Yelizary Avenue, which was named after Mark Yelizarov (1863-1919), who became the first People's Commissar of Railways of Soviet Russia. The Leningrad Metro was under the jurisdiction of the Ministry of Railways.

The station design originally planned to be a station on the ground but has to be changed to an underground station due to hydrological condition of the ground.

From February 8 to December 29, 2016, the station was closed for reconstruction due to issue in waterproofing. The reconstructed Yelizarovskaya has a few changes. Lamps were replaced with LED lighting, entrance were replaced for inclusive designs, an ornamental panel with views of pre-revolutionary St. Petersburg was installed.

== Station information ==
At the station lobby, there is a sculpture named "The Uprising of the Proletariat".
