= Nicholas railway station =

Nicholas railway station was the pre-revolutionary name of the termini of the Moscow-Saint Petersburg Railway:

- Moscow Passazhirskaya railway station, formerly Nikolayevsky and Leningradsky, in Moscow
- Moskovsky railway station (Saint Petersburg) or St.Petersburg-Glavny, in Saint Petersburg
