= Proletarskaya (Saint Petersburg Metro) =

Saint Petersburg Metro Station

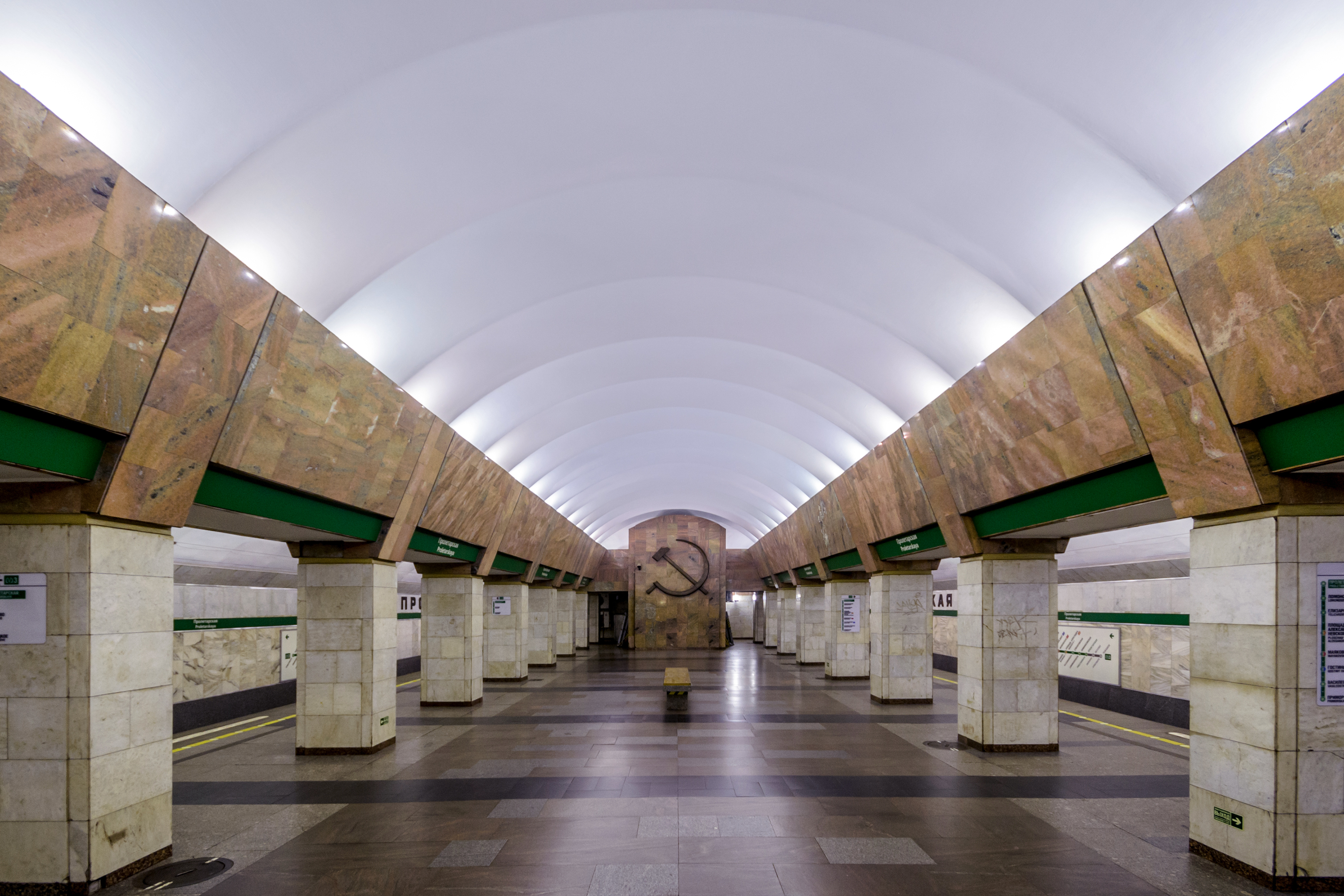
- Station Hall

General information
- Location: Nevsky District; Saint Petersburg; Russia
- Coordinates: 59.865194°N 30.470272°E
- System: Saint Petersburg Metro station
- Owner: Saint Petersburg Metro
- Line: Nevsko–Vasileostrovskaya Line
- Platforms: 1 (Island platform)
- Tracks: 2

Construction
- Structure type: Underground
- Depth: ≈72 m (236 ft)

History
- Opened: July 10, 1981
- Electrified: Third rail

Services
Preceding station	Saint Petersburg Metro	Following station
Lomonosovskaya towards Begovaya	Line 3	Obukhovo towards Rybatskoye
Route map
Location

Proletarskaya (Russian: Пролета́рская) is a station on the Nevsko-Vasileostrovskaya Line of Saint Petersburg Metro, opened on July 10, 1981.
