= Primorskaya (Saint Petersburg Metro) =

Saint Petersburg Metro Station

Coordinates: 59°56′56″N 30°13′58″E

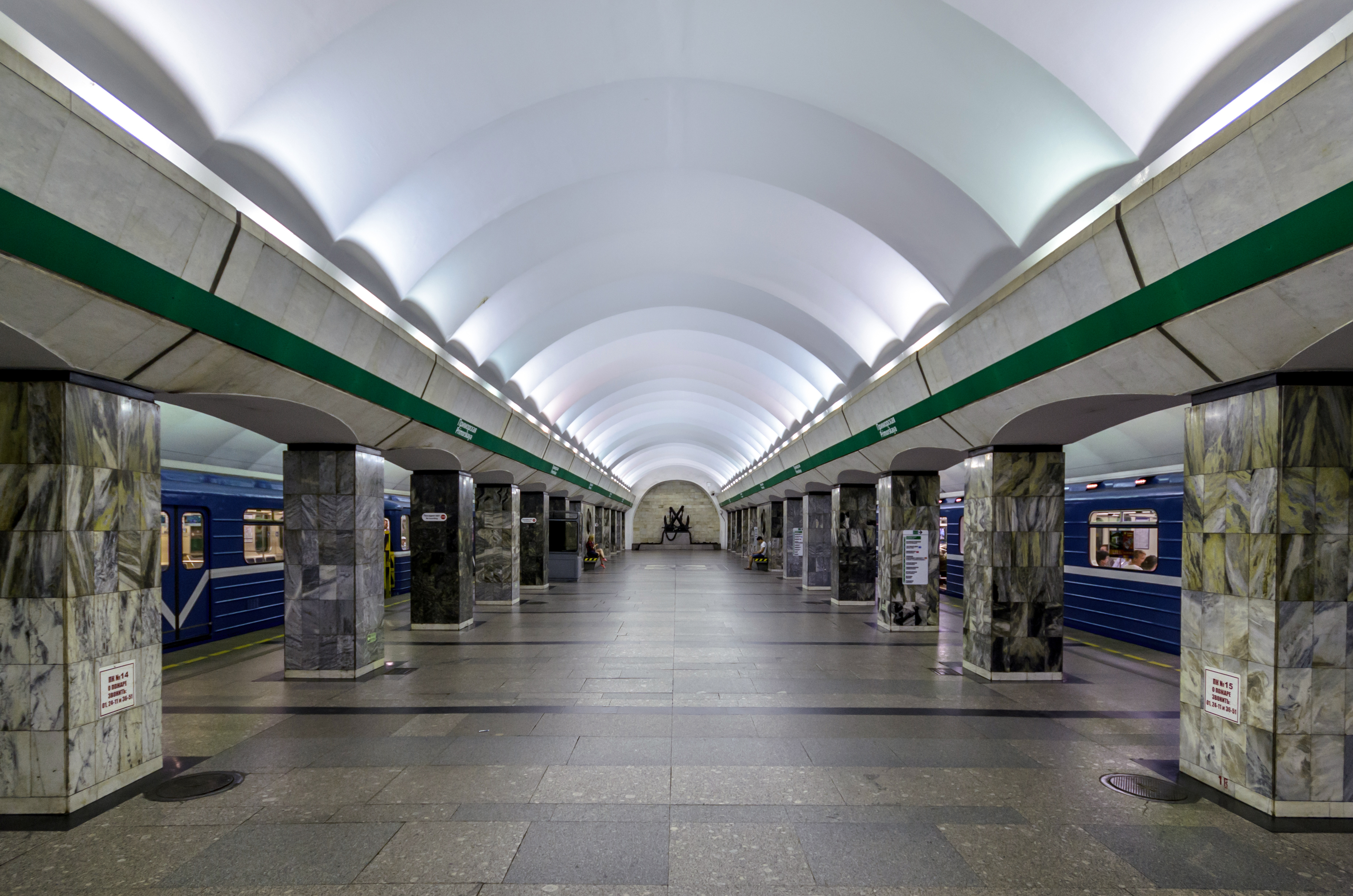
- Station Hall

General information
- Location: Vasileostrovsky District; Saint Petersburg; Russia
- System: Saint Petersburg Metro station
- Owner: Saint Petersburg Metro
- Line: Nevsko–Vasileostrovskaya Line
- Platforms: 1 (Island platform)
- Tracks: 2

Construction
- Structure type: Underground
- Depth: ≈71 m (233 ft)

History
- Opened: 28 September 1979
- Electrified: Third rail

Services
Preceding station	Saint Petersburg Metro	Following station
Zenit towards Begovaya	Line 3	Vasileostrovskaya towards Rybatskoye
Route map
Location

Primorskaya (Russian: Примо́рская) is the station of the Nevsko–Vasileostrovskaya Line (Line 3) of the Saint Petersburg Metro. It was designed by V.N. Sokolov, M.I. Starodubov and V.A. Penno and opened on 28 September 1979. The opening of the station, situated in the western part of Vasilievsky Island, was designed to coincide with the expansion of the local neighborhoods. Like many stations built during the Cold War era, it was designed to double as a fallout shelter. Thus, the underground portion of the station features a set of blast doors a few meters before the escalator. The station's exit vestibule was eventually expanded to house one of the system's communication centers. The building also hosts a metro museum and Metropoliten cafe.

It is also fairly close to Novosmolenskaya Cemetery, the city's first cemetery.

The station is slated to have a transfer link to the Pravoberezhnaya Line. The station it will link to will probably be called Primorskaya II.

The extension of the line north to Novokrestovskaya and Begovaya opened on 26 May 2018.
