= Lomonosovskaya (Saint Petersburg Metro) =

Saint Petersburg Metro Station

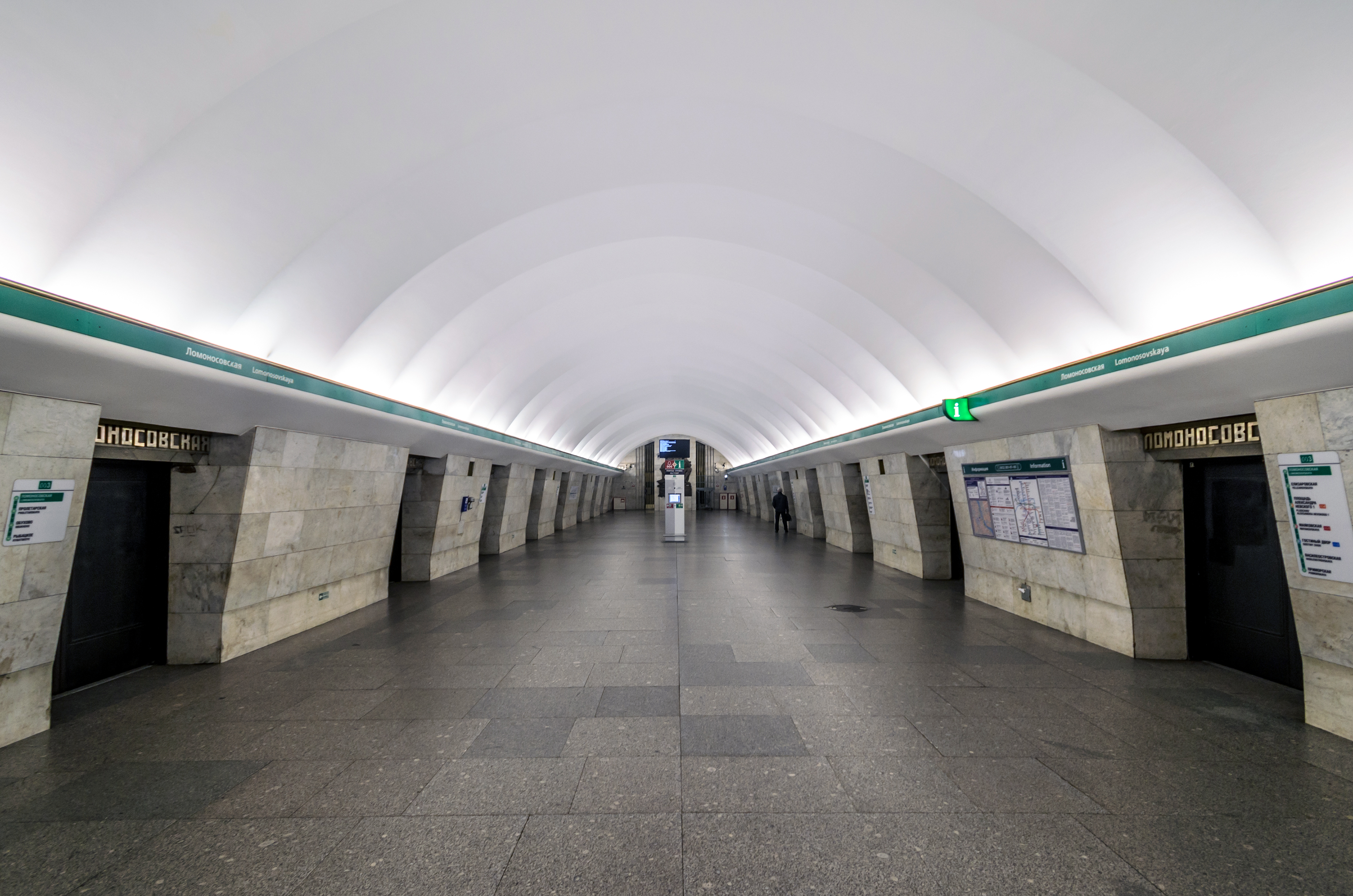
- Station Hall

General information
- Location: Nevsky District; Saint Petersburg; Russia
- Coordinates: 59.877317°N 30.441686°E
- System: Saint Petersburg Metro station
- Owner: Saint Petersburg Metro
- Line: Nevsko–Vasileostrovskaya Line
- Platforms: 1 (Island platform)
- Tracks: 2

Construction
- Structure type: Underground
- Depth: ≈65 m (213 ft)

History
- Opened: December 21, 1970
- Electrified: Third rail

Services
Preceding station	Saint Petersburg Metro	Following station
Yelizarovskaya towards Begovaya	Line 3	Proletarskaya towards Rybatskoye
Route map
Location

Lomonosovskaya (Russian: Ломоно́совская) is a station on the Nevsko–Vasileostrovskaya Line of the Saint Petersburg Metro, opened on December 21, 1970. It is named after Russian polymath Mikhail Lomonosov.
