= Zenit (Saint Petersburg Metro) =

Saint Petersburg Metro station

Coordinates: 59°58′20″N 30°12′42″E

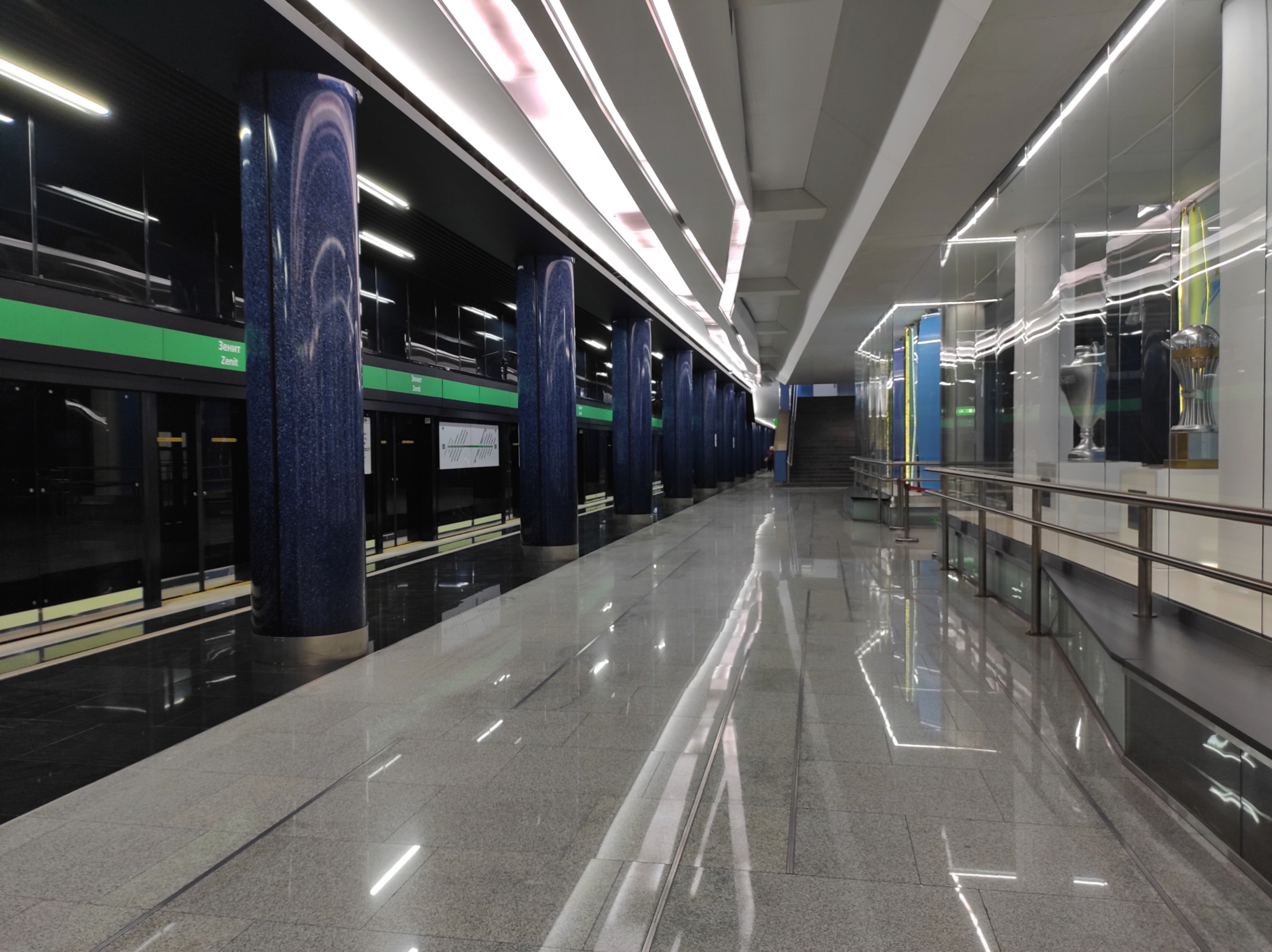

General information
- Location: Petrogradsky District; Saint Petersburg; Russia
- System: Saint Petersburg Metro station
- Owner: Saint Petersburg Metro
- Line: Nevsko–Vasileostrovskaya Line
- Platforms: 2
- Tracks: 2

Construction
- Structure type: Underground
- Depth: 23 m (75 ft)

History
- Opened: 26 May 2018
- Closed: 2 April 2020
- Electrified: Third rail
- Former names: Novokrestovskaya

Services
| Preceding station | Saint Petersburg Metro | Following station |
|---|---|---|
| Begovaya Terminus | Line 3 | Primorskaya towards Rybatskoye |
Route map
Location

Zenit (Russian: Зенит) is a Saint Petersburg Metro station on the Nevsko-Vasileostrovskaya Line (Line 3) of the Saint Petersburg Metro. It opened on 26 May 2018 as Novokrestovskaya as part of the extension of the line to the north from Primorskaya. This extension also included the Begovaya station. Zenit is located between Primorskaya and Begovaya. The station was temporarily closed from 2 April 2020 to 10 June 2021 as part of the measures taken against the COVID-19 pandemic.

The station is situated at the western tip of Krestovsky Island, close to Krestovsky Stadium. The extension of the line had been tied to the 2018 FIFA World Cup, which partly took place at this stadium in summer 2018.

On 19 August 2020, the station, while still closed, was renamed to Zenit as a result of lobbying efforts of FC Zenit Saint Petersburg.

== Entrances and time ==
Entrance 1 (South) opens on game days only. Entrance 2 opens on weekends and game days.

On weekdays, station is closed unless this is a gameday or another event on Gazprom Arena.
