= Vasileostrovskaya =

Saint Petersburg Metro Station

Coordinates: 59.943°N 30.278°E

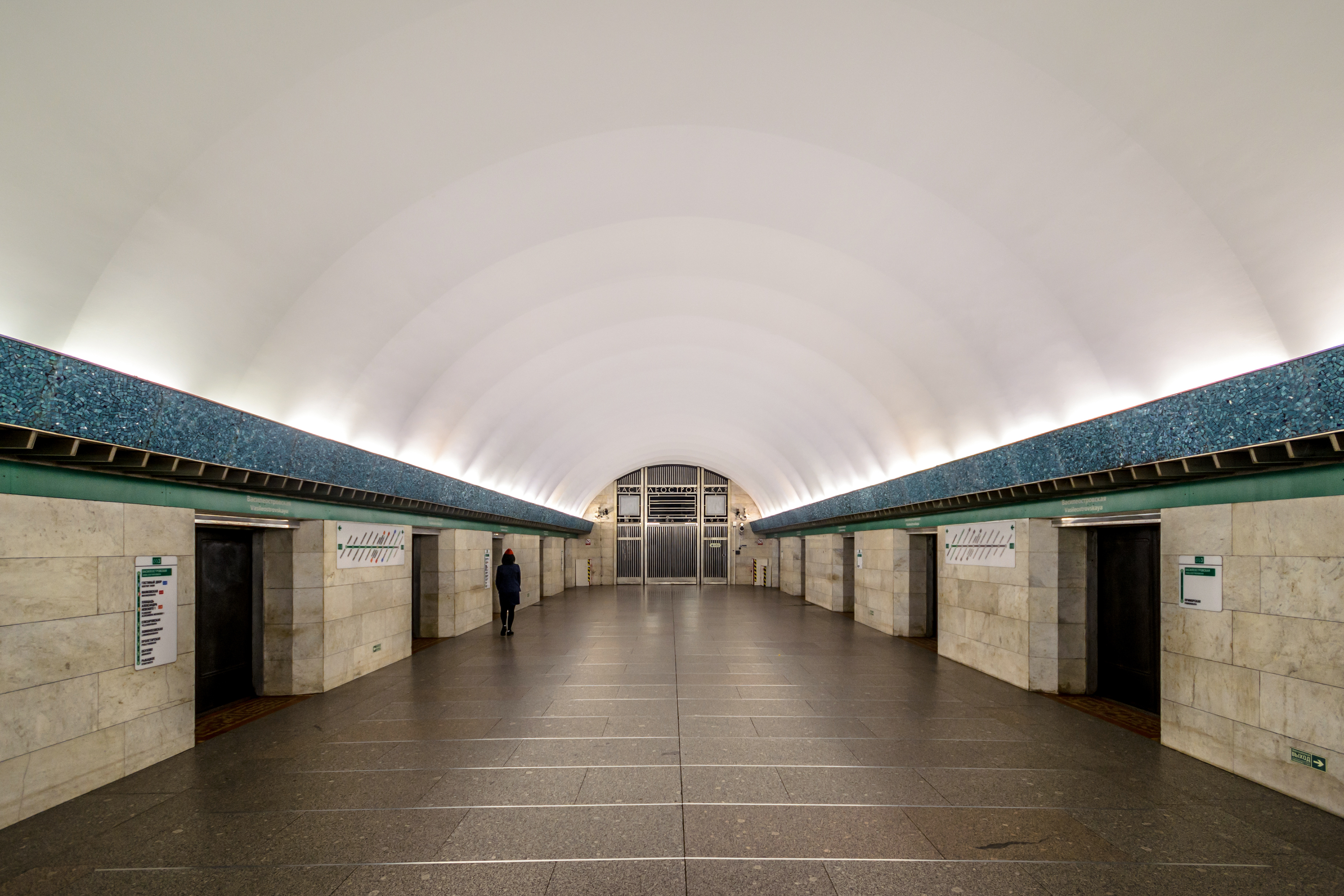
- Station Hall

General information
- Location: Vasileostrovsky District; Saint Petersburg; Russia
- System: Saint Petersburg Metro station
- Owner: Saint Petersburg Metro
- Line: Nevsko–Vasileostrovskaya Line
- Platforms: 1 (Island platform)
- Tracks: 2

Construction
- Structure type: Underground
- Depth: ≈64 m (210 ft)

History
- Opened: 3 November 1967
- Electrified: Third rail

Services
Preceding station	Saint Petersburg Metro	Following station
Primorskaya towards Begovaya	Line 3	Gostiny Dvor towards Rybatskoye
Route map
Location

Vasileostrovkaya (Russian: Василеостро́вская) is a station on the Nevsko–Vasileostrovskaya Line in St Petersburg.

It is named after Vasilyevsky Island where the station is located.
