= Moskovsky railway station (Saint Petersburg) =

Railway station in St. Petersburg, Russia

Coordinates: 59°55′47″N 30°21′44″E

St. Petersburg–Moskovsky Санкт-Петербург–Московский
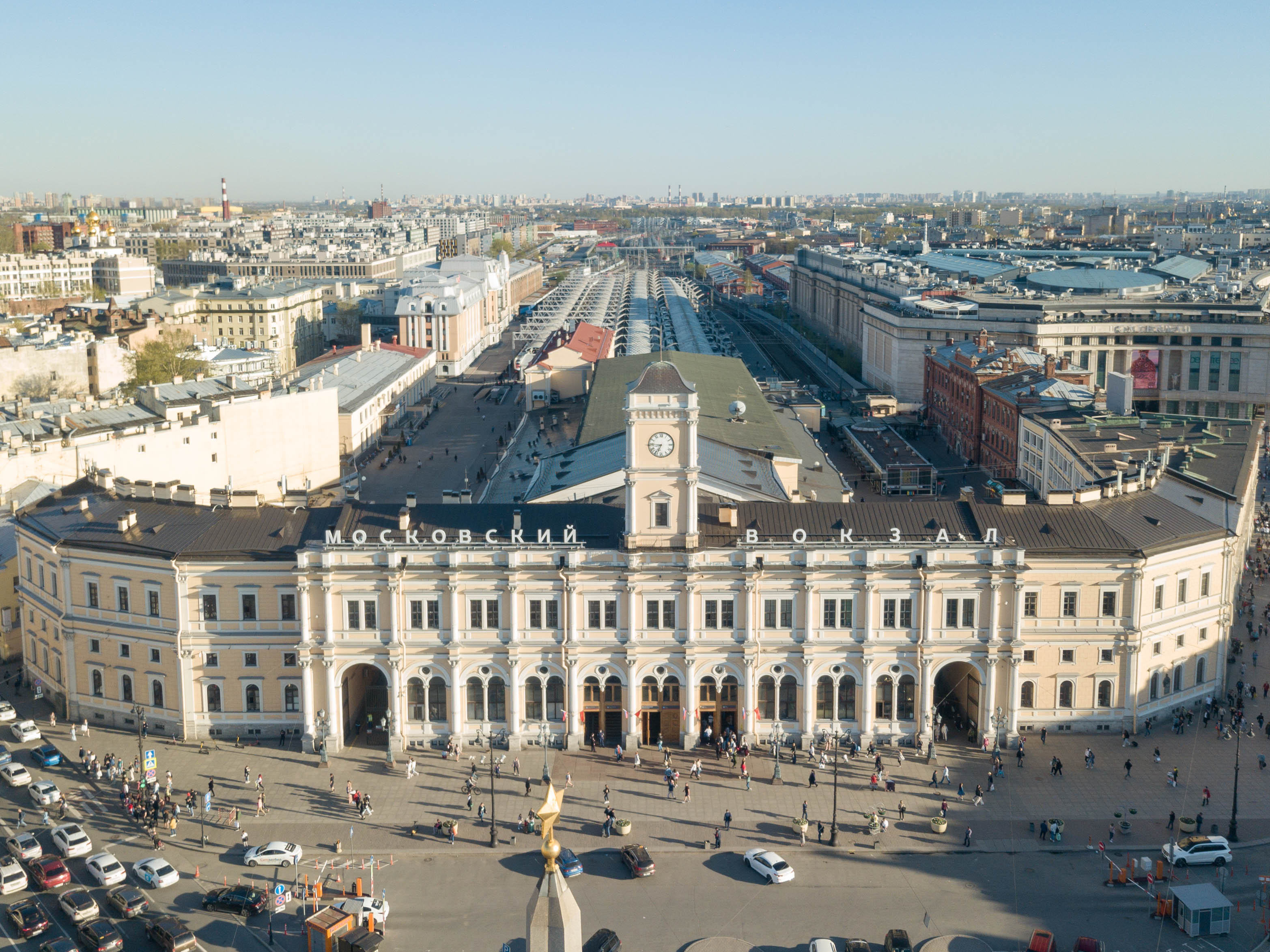
- View of the station from Vosstaniya Square

General information
- Location: 85, Nevsky av., St. Petersburg; Russia
- Owner: Russian Railways
- Operator: October Railway
- Line: Saint Petersburg–Moscow railway
- Platforms: 6 (5 island platforms)
- Tracks: 11
- Connections: Saint Petersburg Metro stations: Ploshchad Vosstaniya; Mayakovskaya

Construction
- Structure type: At-grade
- Parking: Yes
- Architect: Konstantin Thon

Other information
- Station code: 03181
- Fare zone: 0

History
- Opened: 1847
- Rebuilt: 1952, 1967, 1976
- Electrified: 1962
- Former names: Nicholaevsky (1851–1923); Oktyabrsky (1923–1930)

Services
Preceding station	Russian Railways	Following station
Terminus	Sapsan	Chudovo towards Moscow Leningradsky
Mga towards Murmansk	Kirov Railway	Terminus
Location

St. Petersburg–Moskovsky (Russian: Санкт-Петербург–Московский), is a railway station terminal in Saint Petersburg, Russia. It is a terminus for the Saint Petersburg–Moscow Railway and other lines running from Central and South Russia and Crimea.

== History ==
The oldest preserved station in the city, it was erected in 1844-51 to a design by Konstantin Thon. As Nicholas I of Russia was the reigning monarch and the greatest patron of railway construction in the realm, the station was named Nicholaevsky after him. Rechristened Oktyabrsky to memorialize the October Revolution in 1924, the station was not given its present name until 1930.

Although large "Venetian" windows, two floors of Corinthian columns and a two-storey clocktower at the centre explicitly reference Italian Renaissance architecture, the building incorporates other features from a variety of periods and countries. A twin train station, currently known as the Leningradsky railway station, was built to Thon's design at the other end of the railway, in Moscow.

While Thon's facade remains fundamentally intact to this day, the station was expanded in 1869-79 and 1912. It was completely redeveloped internally in 1950-52 and 1967. A bronze bust of Peter the Great in the main vestibule was unveiled in 1993, replacing a bust of Lenin. The station is served by the Mayakovskaya and Vosstaniya Square stations of the Saint Petersburg Metro, with both stations linked to the station building by an underground corridor.

== Services ==
=== High-speed rail ===
Train number	Train name	Destination	Operator(s)	Ref.
151/152; 153/154; 155/156; 159/160; 163/164; 165/166	Sapsan (rus: Сапсан)	(Russia) Moscow (Leningradsky)	(Russia) Russian Railways	

== Gallery ==
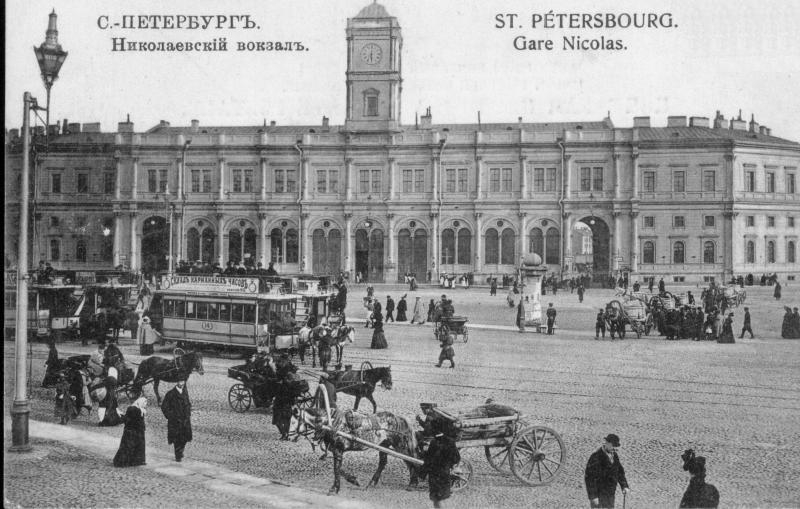
The station in the 1900s

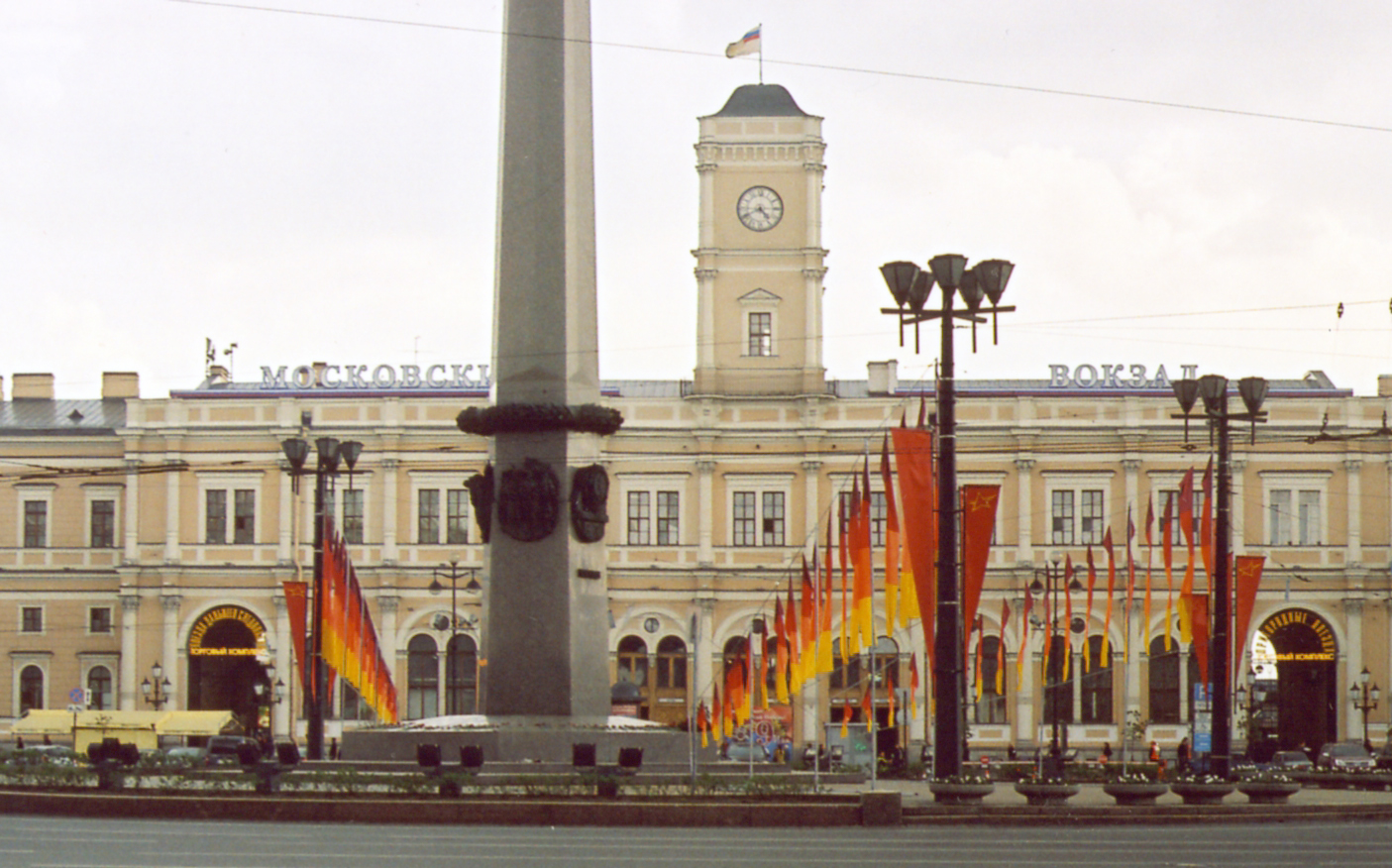
Station on Victory Day

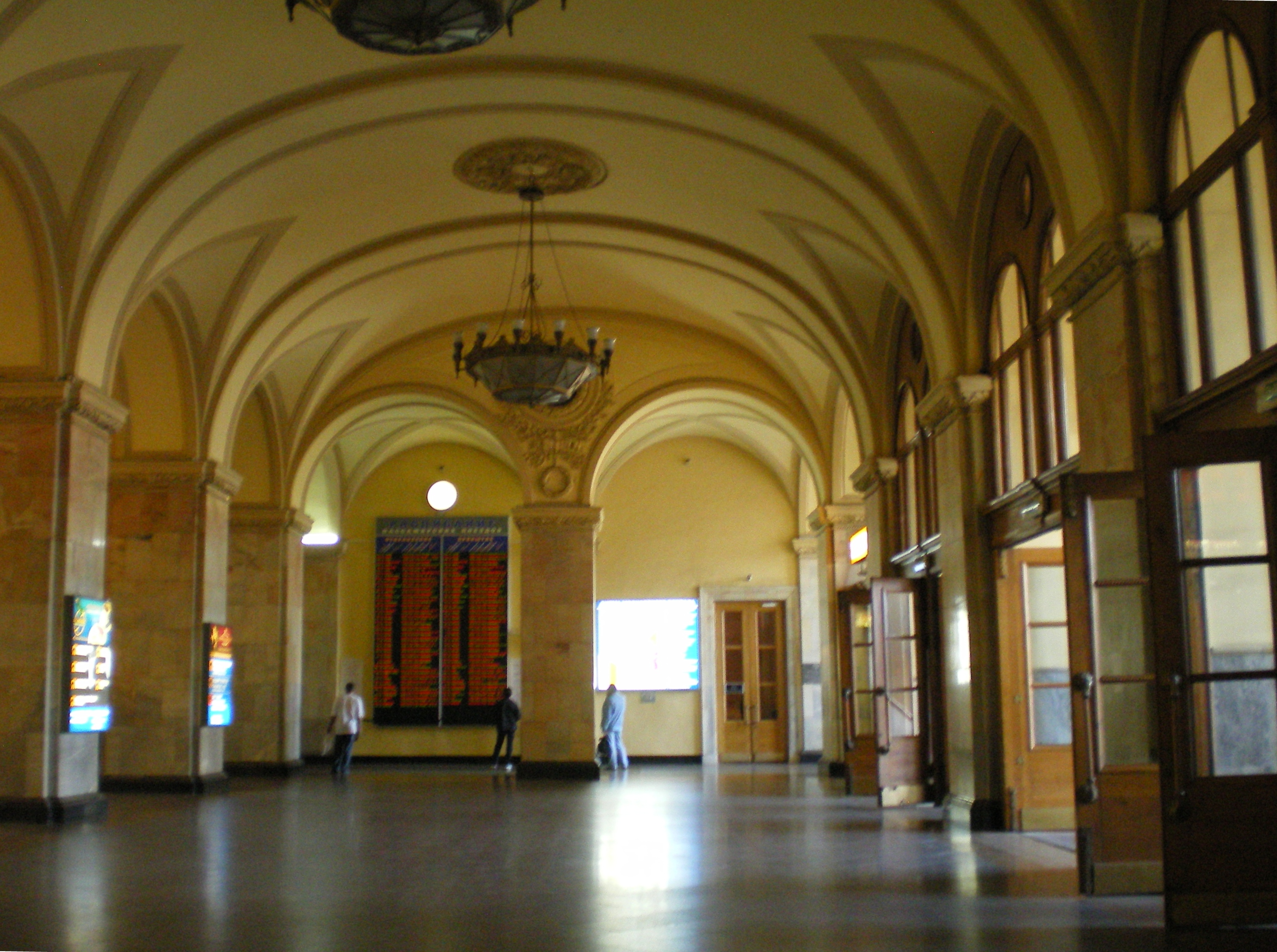
The vaulted hall

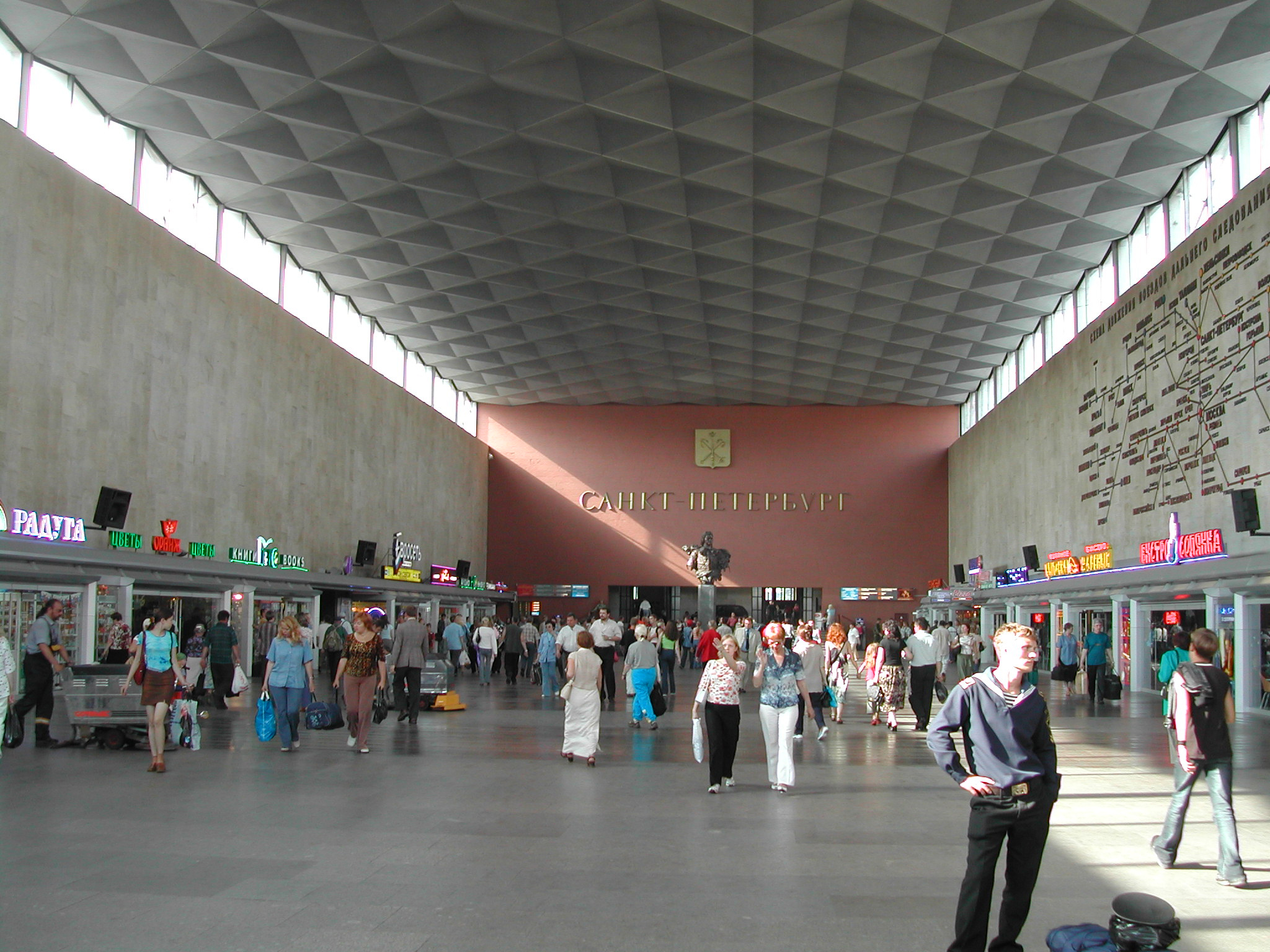
The station's main ticket and waiting hall

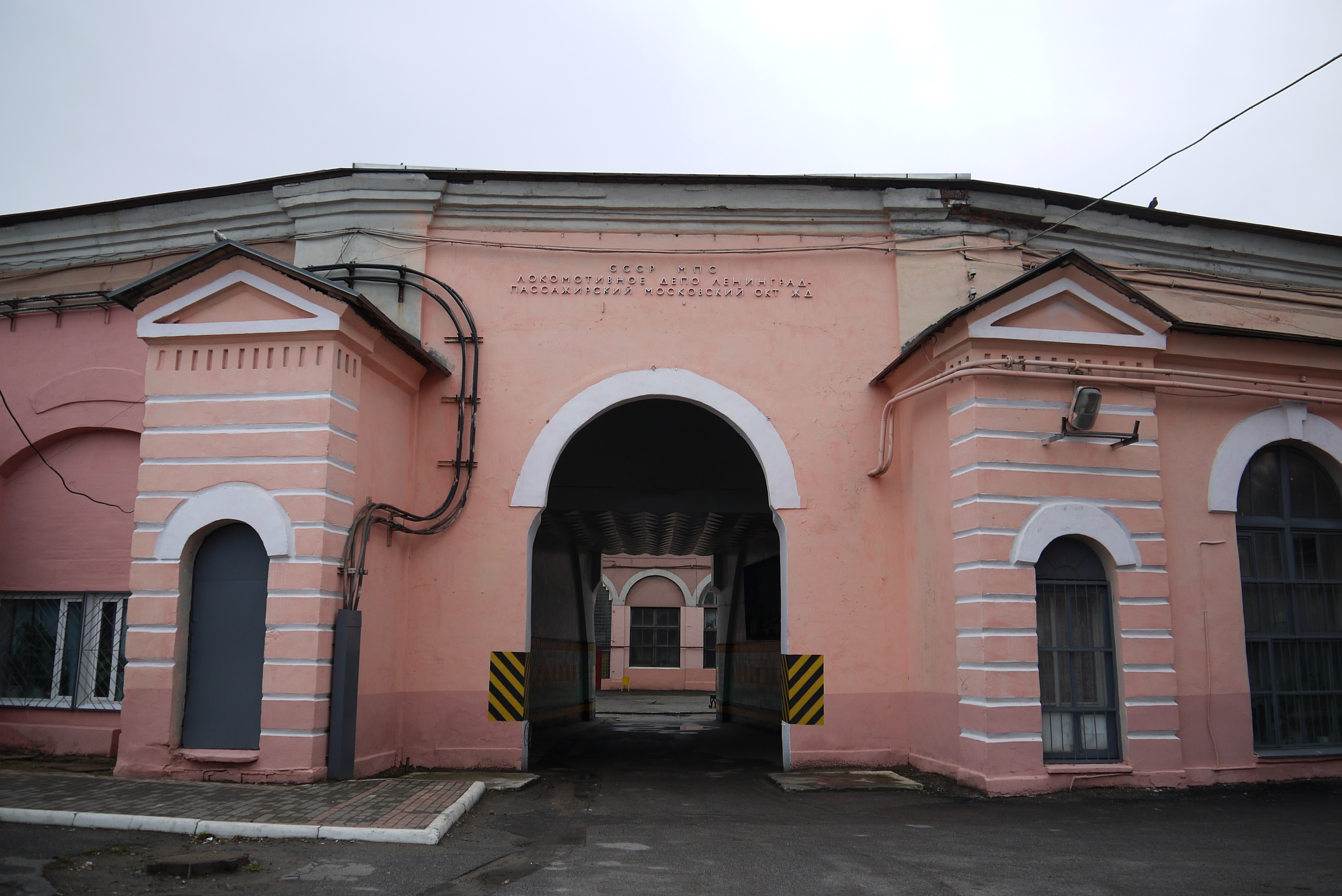
The entrance to the original roundhouse of the Nikolaev Railway at the locomotive depot at Moskovsky railway station. The roundhouse dates from the 1850s.

== See also ==
- Emperor railway station, Pushkin town
