= Ploshchad Alexandra Nevskogo I (Saint Petersburg Metro) =

Saint Petersburg Metro Station

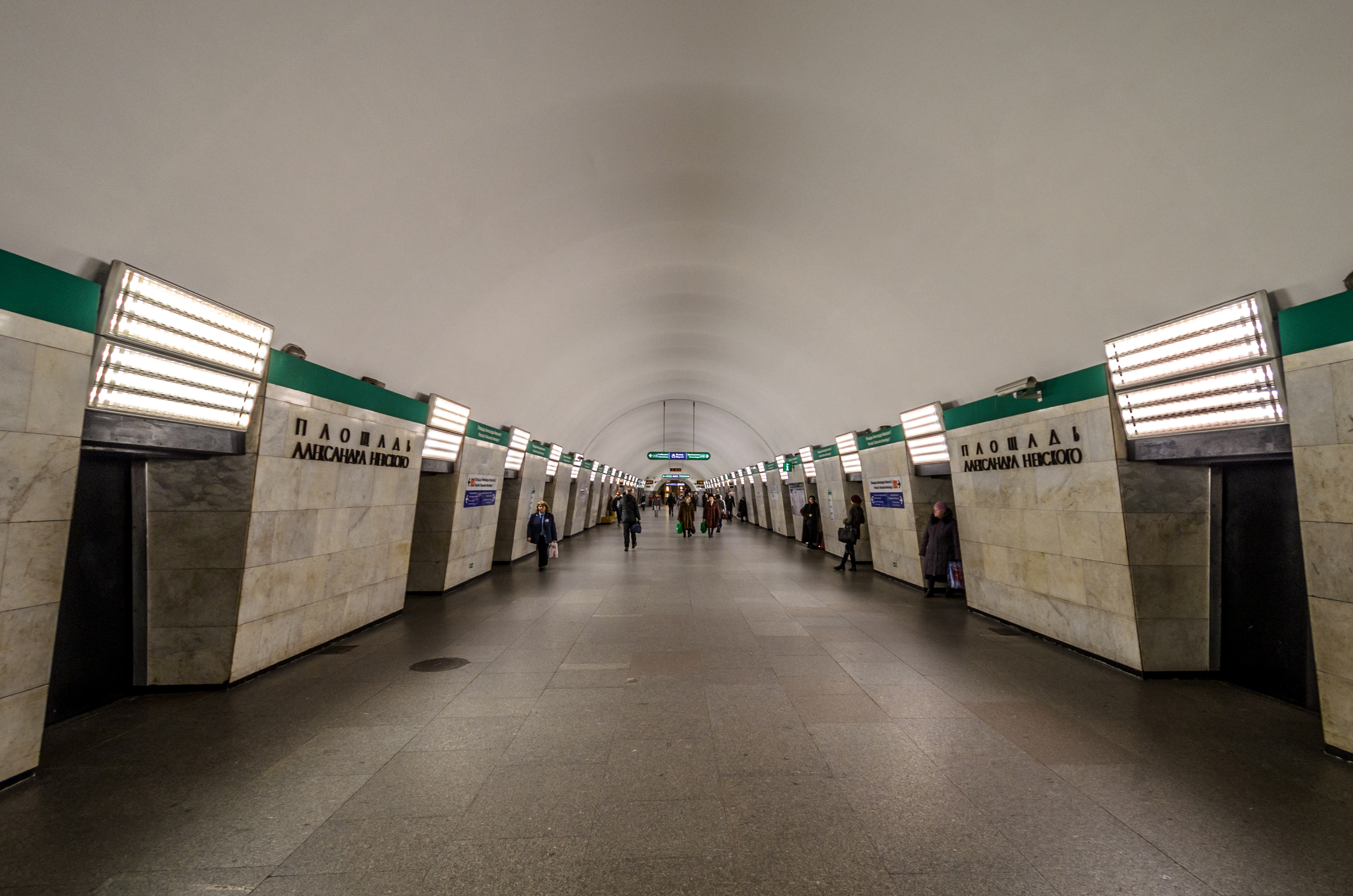
- Station Hall

General information
- Location: Tsentralny District; Saint Petersburg; Russia
- Coordinates: 59.924369°N 30.384989°E
- System: Saint Petersburg Metro station
- Owner: Saint Petersburg Metro
- Line: Nevsko–Vasileostrovskaya Line
- Platforms: 1 (Island platform)
- Tracks: 2

Construction
- Structure type: Underground
- Depth: ≈54 m (177 ft)

History
- Opened: 3 November 1967

Services
| Preceding station | Saint Petersburg Metro | Following station |
|---|---|---|
| Mayakovskaya towards Begovaya | Line 3 | Yelizarovskaya towards Rybatskoye |
| Ligovsky Prospekt towards Gorny Institut | Line 4 transfer at Ploshchad Alexandra Nevskogo II | Novocherkasskaya towards Ulitsa Dybenko |
Route map
Location

Ploshchad Alexandra Nevskogo I (Russian: Пло́щадь Алекса́ндра Не́вского-1) is a station on the Nevsko–Vasileostrovskaya Line of Saint Petersburg Metro, opened on 3 November 1967.

The station pavilion was designed by architects A.S. Getskin and V.P. Shuvalova. The vestibule is circular in plan: passengers first enter a curved corridor – flanked by ticket counters - which leads into a round excalator hall topped by a domed ceiling. The interior is finished with Estonian dolomite, Chernovsky marble, ceramic tiles, and wood.
