= Krestovsky Stadium =

Stadium in Saint Petersburg, Russia

Coordinates: 59°58′23″N 30°13′14″E

Gazprom Arena
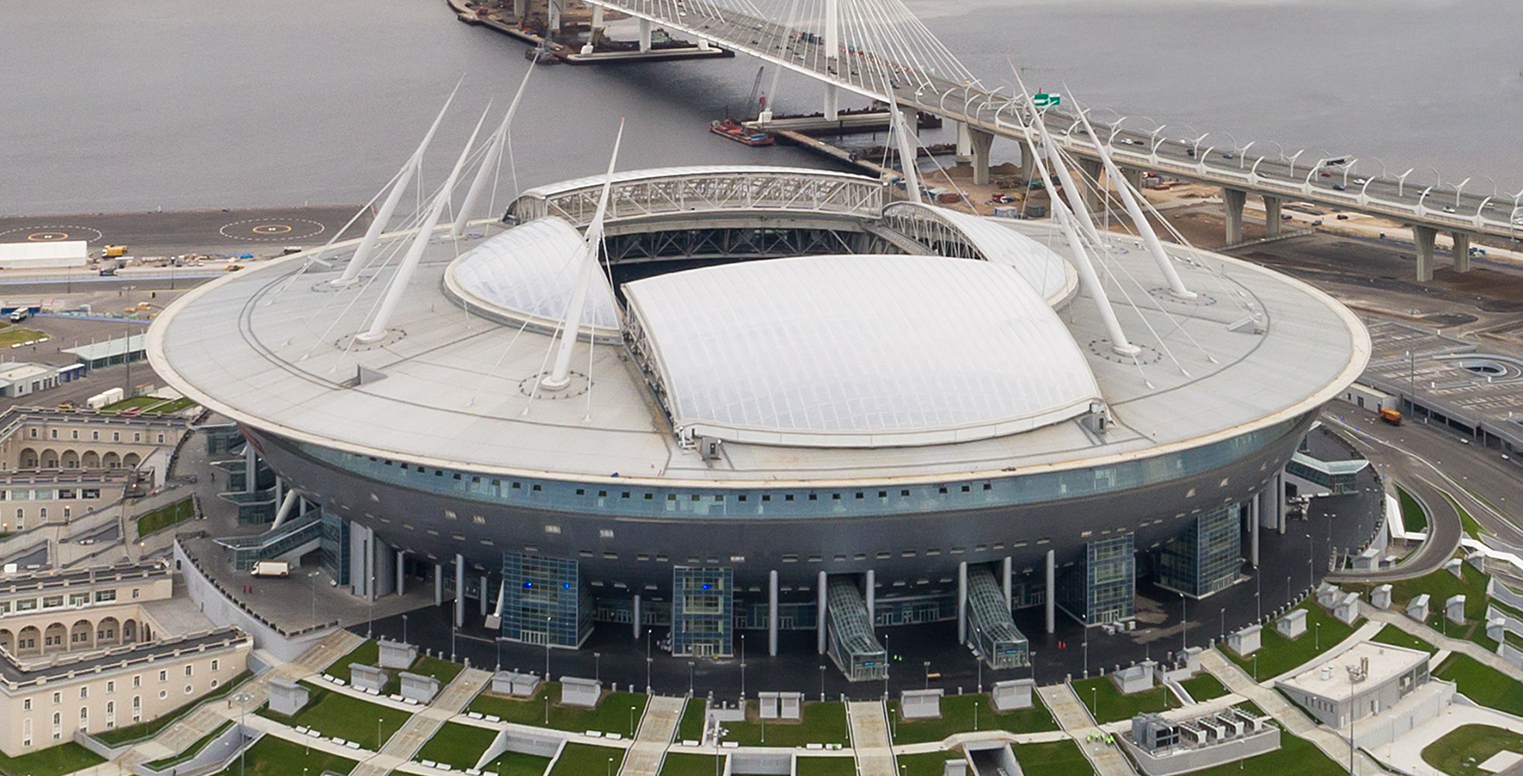
- UEFA
- Interactive map of Gazprom Arena
- Location: Futbol'naya Alleya 1, Saint Petersburg, Russia
- Owner: Saint Petersburg City Administration
- Operator: Zenit Saint Petersburg
- Capacity: 68,000; 60,177 (RPL); 64,468 (2018 FIFA World Cup)
- Roof: Retractable
- Surface: Grass
- Record attendance: 71,381 (Channel One Cup, Russia v. Finland, 16 December 2018)
- Field size: 105 x 68 m
- Public transit: Nevsko–Vasileostrovskaya Line Zenit; Frunzensko–Primorskaya Line Krestovsky Ostrov

Construction
- Groundbreaking: Late 2008
- Built: 29 December 2016 (commissioning)
- Opened: 22 April 2017
- Cost: ₽ 43 billion € 597 million $ 660 million
- Architect: Kisho Kurokawa
- Project manager: КБ ВиПС (KB ViPS) (https://kbvips.ru/)

Tenants
- Zenit Saint Petersburg (2017–present); Russia national football team (selected matches): Major sporting events hosted; 2017 FIFA Confederations Cup; 2018 FIFA World Cup; UEFA Euro 2020

Website
- gazprom-arena.com

Krestovsky Stadium, known as Gazprom Arena for sponsorship reasons (Russian: «Газпром Арена»), is a retractable roof stadium with a retractable pitch in the western portion of Krestovsky Island in Saint Petersburg, Russia, which serves as home for Zenit Saint Petersburg. The stadium was opened in 2017 for the FIFA Confederations Cup.

It is called Saint Petersburg Stadium during major international tournaments, including the 2017 FIFA Confederations Cup, 2018 FIFA World Cup, and UEFA Euro 2020.

== History ==
The stadium was built as one of the venues for the 2018 FIFA World Cup. The competition between architectural projects was won by Kisho Kurokawa's "The Spaceship". The design of the stadium is a modified and enlarged version of the Toyota Stadium in Toyota City, Japan, which was also designed by Kurokawa. The stadium was built on the location where the former Kirov Stadium used to stand before it was demolished. The capacity of 56,196 seats was increased to 68,000 seats for the World Cup. It also has 104 luxuriously designed skyboxes.

In 2005, the planning of the stadium began. Initial construction work began in late 2008.

In January 2009, The St. Petersburg Times reported that the project was now to be funded by the city government of St Petersburg, with Gazprom switching to build a separate skyscraper project. The City Hall had to step in after Gazprom declined to invest any further money into the stadium's construction. Before the stadium was named Sankt Petersburg in October 2015, it was known under the names Zenit Arena, Gazprom Arena and Piter Arena.

On 25 July 2016, the general contractor, Inzhtransstroy-Spb, issued a statement that the city authorities have failed to pay 1 billion rubles ($15.8 million at the current exchange rate) worth of construction work and stopped the work. The next day the contract was terminated. On 1 August there were reports of wind damage to parts of the metal sheathing, and a flood.

In the end of August 2016, the new general contractor, Metrostroy, resumed construction works on the site.

In April 2017, the work on the stadium was completed. The total cost of the stadium amounted to 24 billion rubles. The first official match held at the stadium was the Russian Premier League game between Zenit Saint Petersburg and Ural on 22 April 2017. Branislav Ivanović scored the first goal in the stadium's history.

On 17 June 2017, the first game of 2017 FIFA Confederations Cup was held at the stadium with the Group A match between the host Russia and New Zealand.

On 2 July 2017, the 2017 FIFA Confederations Cup Final was held at the stadium between Chile and Germany, becoming the most attended match of the tournament and also setting the record attendance for the stadium.

On 15 February 2018, the government of Saint Petersburg signed a contract for the rights and use of the stadium with Zenit Arena LLC, which is a subsidiary of JSC football club Zenit.

On 16 December 2018, the stadium hosted a Channel One Cup ice hockey match between Russia and Finland. 71,381 spectators attended the game, setting a record attendance for domestic ice hockey and the stadium overall.

On 2 August 2019, Rammstein played a concert at the stadium as part of their stadium tour.

After the 2022 Russian invasion of Ukraine, it was announced that the 2022 UEFA Champions League Final would be moved from the Gazprom Arena to the Stade de France.

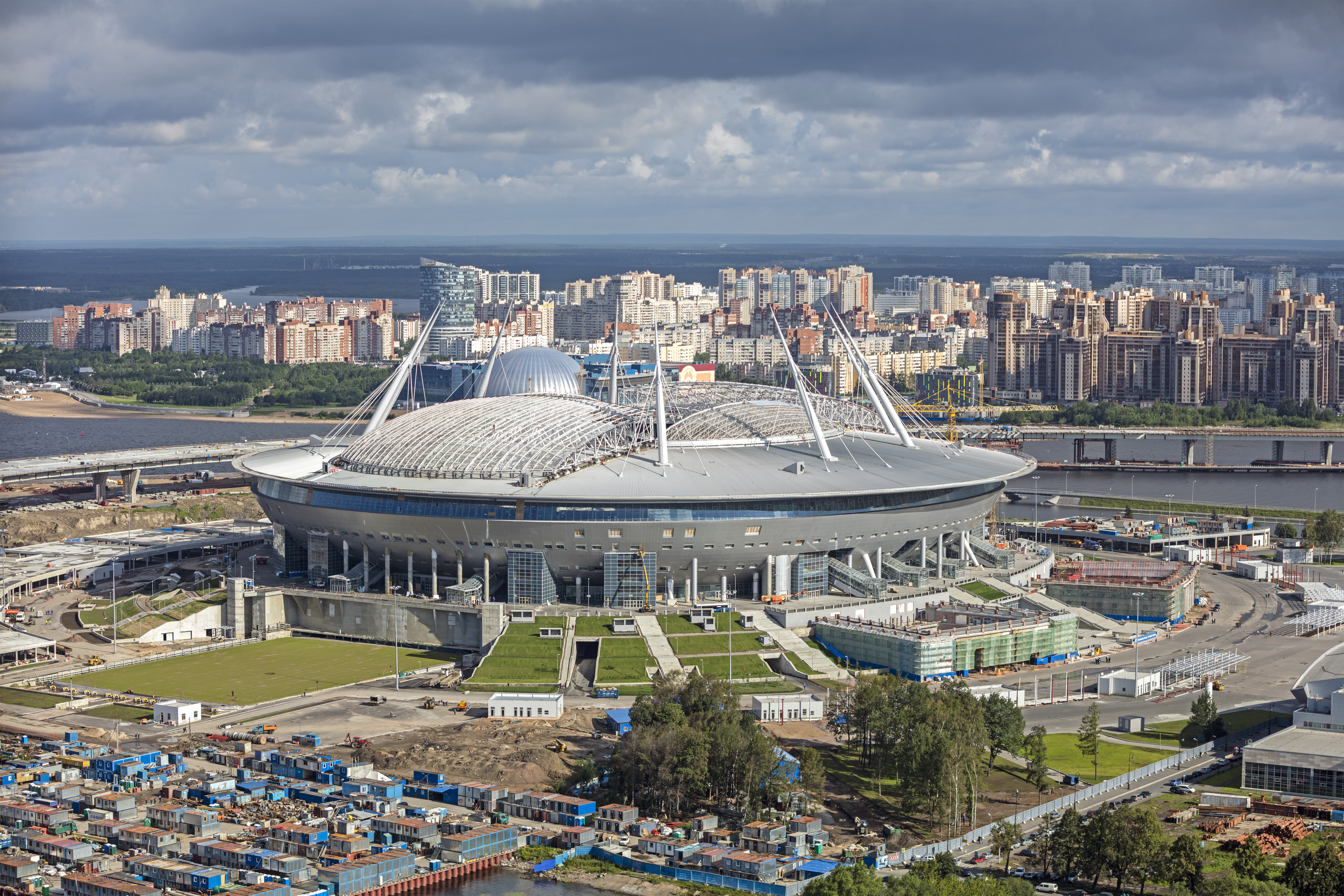
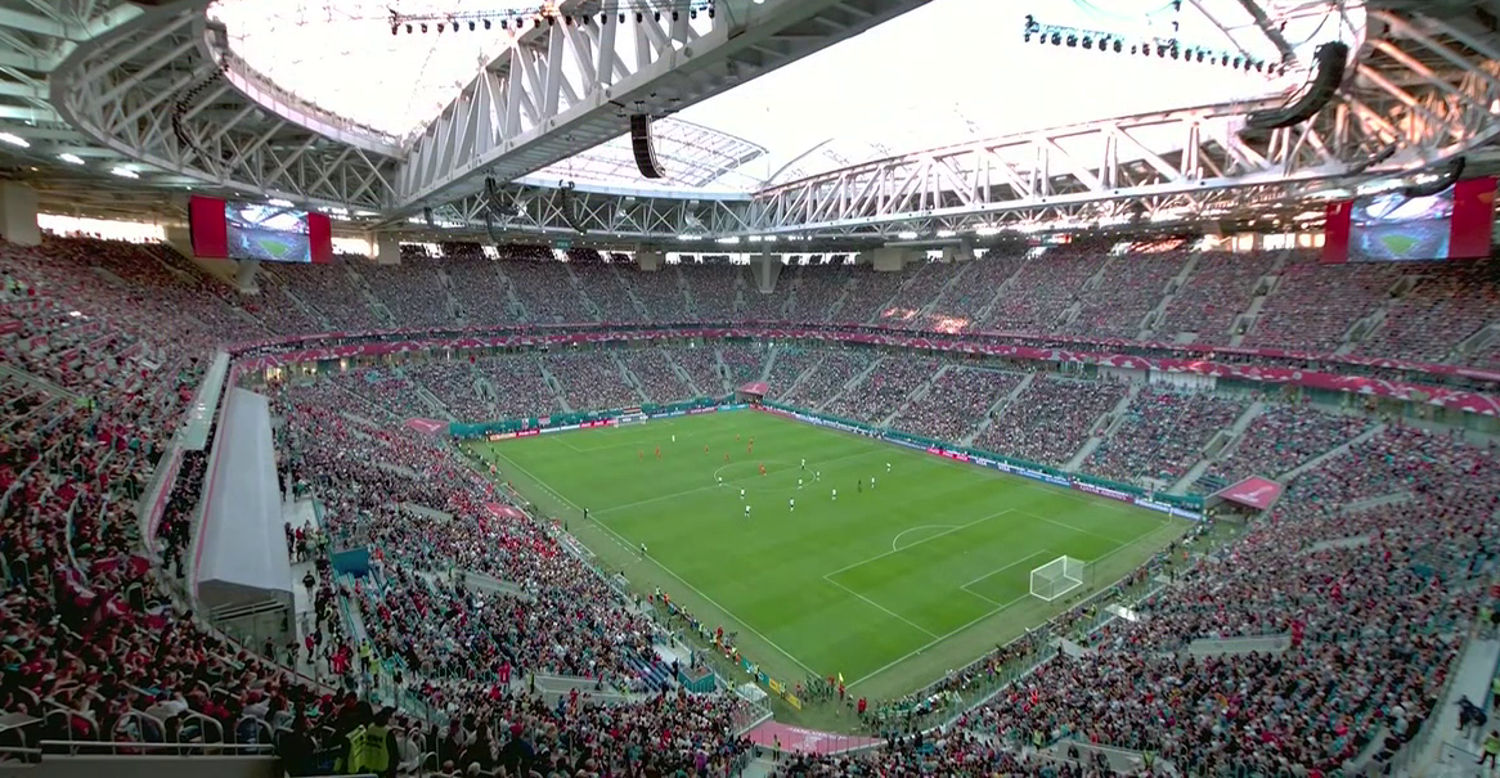
The stadium under construction in 2016; the stadium during the 2017 FIFA Confederations Cup Final

== 2017 FIFA Confederations Cup ==
Date	Time	Team #1	Result	Team #2	Round	Attendance
17 June 2017	18:00	Russia	2–0	New Zealand	Group A	50,251
22 June 2017	18:00	Cameroon	1–1	Australia	Group B	35,021
24 June 2017	18:00	New Zealand	0–4	Portugal	Group A	56,290
2 July 2017	21:00	Chile	0–1	Germany	Final	57,268

== 2018 FIFA World Cup ==
Saint Petersburg was one of the host venues, seven matches during the 2018 FIFA World Cup.

Date	Time	Team #1	Result	Team #2	Round	Attendance
15 June 2018	18:00	Morocco	0–1	Iran	Group B	62,548
19 June 2018	21:00	Russia	3–1	Egypt	Group A	64,468
22 June 2018	15:00	Brazil	2–0	Costa Rica	Group E	64,468
26 June 2018	21:00	Nigeria	1–2	Argentina	Group D	64,468
3 July 2018	17:00	Sweden	1–0	Switzerland	Round of 16	64,042
10 July 2018	21:00	France	1–0	Belgium	Semi-final	64,286
14 July 2018	17:00	Belgium	2–0	England	Third place match	64,406

== UEFA Euro 2020 ==
On 19 September 2014, it was announced by UEFA that the stadium was chosen to host four UEFA Euro 2020 finals fixtures, three group games and a quarter-final match. On 23 April 2021, the stadium was given three additional group stage matches in Group E (Poland vs. Slovakia, Sweden vs. Slovakia and Sweden vs. Poland) following the removal of the Aviva Stadium in Dublin as a Euro 2020 host city due to the ongoing COVID-19 pandemic in the Republic of Ireland.

Date	Time	Team #1	Score	Team #2	Round	Attendance
12 June 2021	21:00	Belgium	3–0	Russia	Group B	26,264
14 June 2021	18:00	Poland	1–2	Slovakia	Group E	12,862
16 June 2021	15:00	Finland	0–1	Russia	Group B	24,540
18 June 2021	15:00	Sweden	1–0	Slovakia	Group E	11,525
21 June 2021	21:00	Finland	0–2	Belgium	Group B	18,545
23 June 2021	18:00	Sweden	3–2	Poland	Group E	14,252
2 July 2021	19:00	Switzerland	1–1 (a.e.t.) (1–3 p)	Spain	Quarter-finals	24,764

== UEFA Champions League Matches ==
On 24 September 2019, UEFA announced that the stadium would host the 2021 UEFA Champions League Final. However, due to adjustments of the 2020 final caused by the COVID-19 pandemic in Europe, their hosting time was pushed back a year to 2022. As a result of the Russian invasion of Ukraine on 24 February, UEFA called an extraordinary meeting of the executive committee, and the next day, UEFA confirmed that the final would be moved to the Stade de France in Saint-Denis, a suburb of Paris.

Date	Time (MSK)	Team #1	Result	Team #2	Round	Attendance
2 October 2019	22:00	(Russia) Zenit Saint Petersburg	3–1	(Portugal) Benfica	Group G	51,683
5 November 2019	20:55	(Russia) Zenit Saint Petersburg	0–2	(Germany) RB Leipzig	Group G	50,452
27 November 2019	20:55	(Russia) Zenit Saint Petersburg	2–0	(France) Lyon	Group G	51,183
20 October 2020	19:55	(Russia) Zenit Saint Petersburg	1–2	(Belgium) Club Brugge	Group F	16,682
4 November 2020	20:55	(Russia) Zenit Saint Petersburg	1–1	(Italy) Lazio	Group F	17,427
8 December 2020	20:55	(Russia) Zenit Saint Petersburg	1–2	(Germany) Borussia Dortmund	Group F	10,860
29 September 2021	19:45	(Russia) Zenit Saint Petersburg	4–0	(Sweden) Malmö FF	Group H	15,339
20 October 2021	22:00	(Russia) Zenit Saint Petersburg	0–1	(Italy) Juventus	Group H	18,717
8 December 2021	19:45	(Russia) Zenit Saint Petersburg	3–3	(England) Chelsea	Group H	29,349

== UEFA Europa League Matches ==
Date	Time (MSK)	Team #1	Result	Team #2	Round	Attendance
3 August 2017	20:00	(Russia) Zenit Saint Petersburg	0-1	(Israel) Bnei Yehuda	Third qualifying round	45,670
24 August 2017	20:00	(Russia) Zenit Saint Petersburg	2-0 (a.e.t.)	(Netherlands) Utrecht	Qualifying round play-offs	49,237
28 September 2017	20:00	(Russia) Zenit Saint Petersburg	3-1	(Spain) Real Sociedad	Group L	50,487
19 October 2017	20:00	(Russia) Zenit Saint Petersburg	3-1	(Norway) Rosenborg	Group L	46,211
23 November 2017	21:00	(Russia) Zenit Saint Petersburg	2-1	(North Macedonia) Vardar	Group L	38,196
22 February 2018	21:00	(Russia) Zenit Saint Petersburg	3-0	(Scotland) Celtic	Round of 32	50,492
15 March 2018	21:00	(Russia) Zenit Saint Petersburg	1-1	(Germany) RB Leipzig	Round of 16	44,092
23 August 2018	19:00	(Russia) Zenit Saint Petersburg	3-1	(Norway) Molde	Qualifying round play-offs	40,677
4 October 2018	19:55	(Russia) Zenit Saint Petersburg	1-0	(Czech Republic) Slavia Prague	Group C	45,408
25 October 2018	19:55	(Russia) Zenit Saint Petersburg	2-1	(France) Bordeaux	Group C	45,723
25 October 2018	20:55	(Russia) Zenit Saint Petersburg	1-0	(Denmark) Copenhagen	Group C	45,199
21 February 2019	20:55	(Russia) Zenit Saint Petersburg	1-0	(Turkey) Fenerbahçe	Round of 32	50,448
7 March 2019	20:55	(Russia) Zenit Saint Petersburg	1-3	(Spain) Villarreal	Round of 16	51,826
17 February 2022	20:45	(Russia) Zenit Saint Petersburg	2–3	(Spain) Real Betis	Knockout round play-offs	28,936

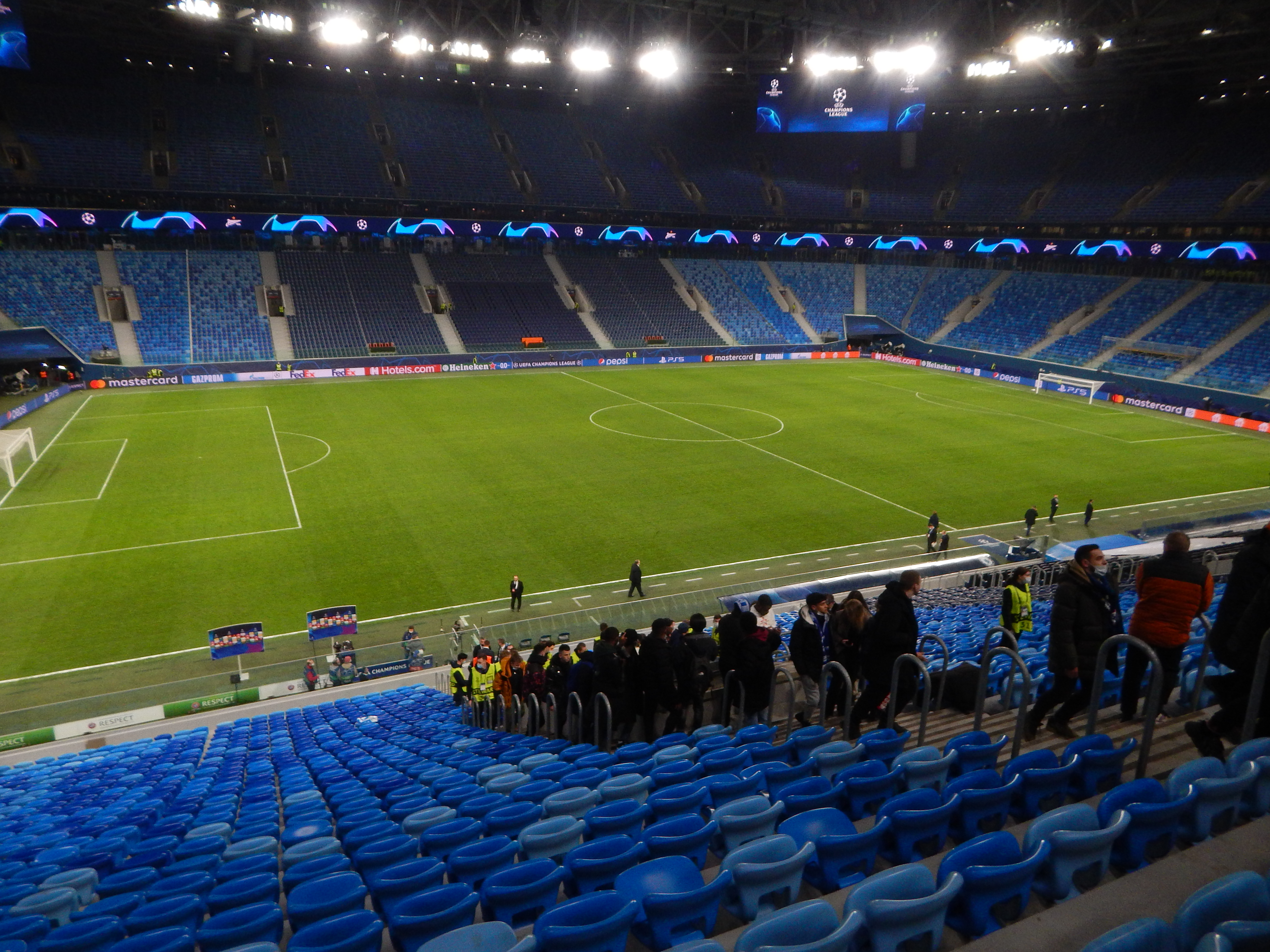
Saint Petersburg Arena after a UEFA Champions League match in 2021

== Conditions for spectators with disabilities ==
Saint Petersburg Arena offers 560 seats for people with disabilities, 266 of them are for wheelchair users. Moreover, the stadium design includes special lobbies, elevators and ramps to ensure accessibility to spectators with limited mobility.

== Safety and security ==
The stadium has been fully prepared for the FIFA World Cup games in accordance with the FIFA requirements for capacity and security. The stadium is equipped with a video surveillance and identification system that makes it possible to detect any troublemakers and fans who are not allowed to enter.

== Average attendances ==
Tenants	League season	Home games	Average attendance
Zenit	2024	15	28,159
Zenit	2023	15	31,236
Zenit	2018-19	15	48,122
Zenit	2017-18	15	43,963
Zenit	2016-17	15	43,963

Preceded by Maracanã Stadium; Rio de Janeiro	FIFA Confederations Cup; Final venue 2017	Succeeded by last stadium
