= Gostiny Dvor (Saint Petersburg Metro) =

Saint Petersburg Metro Station

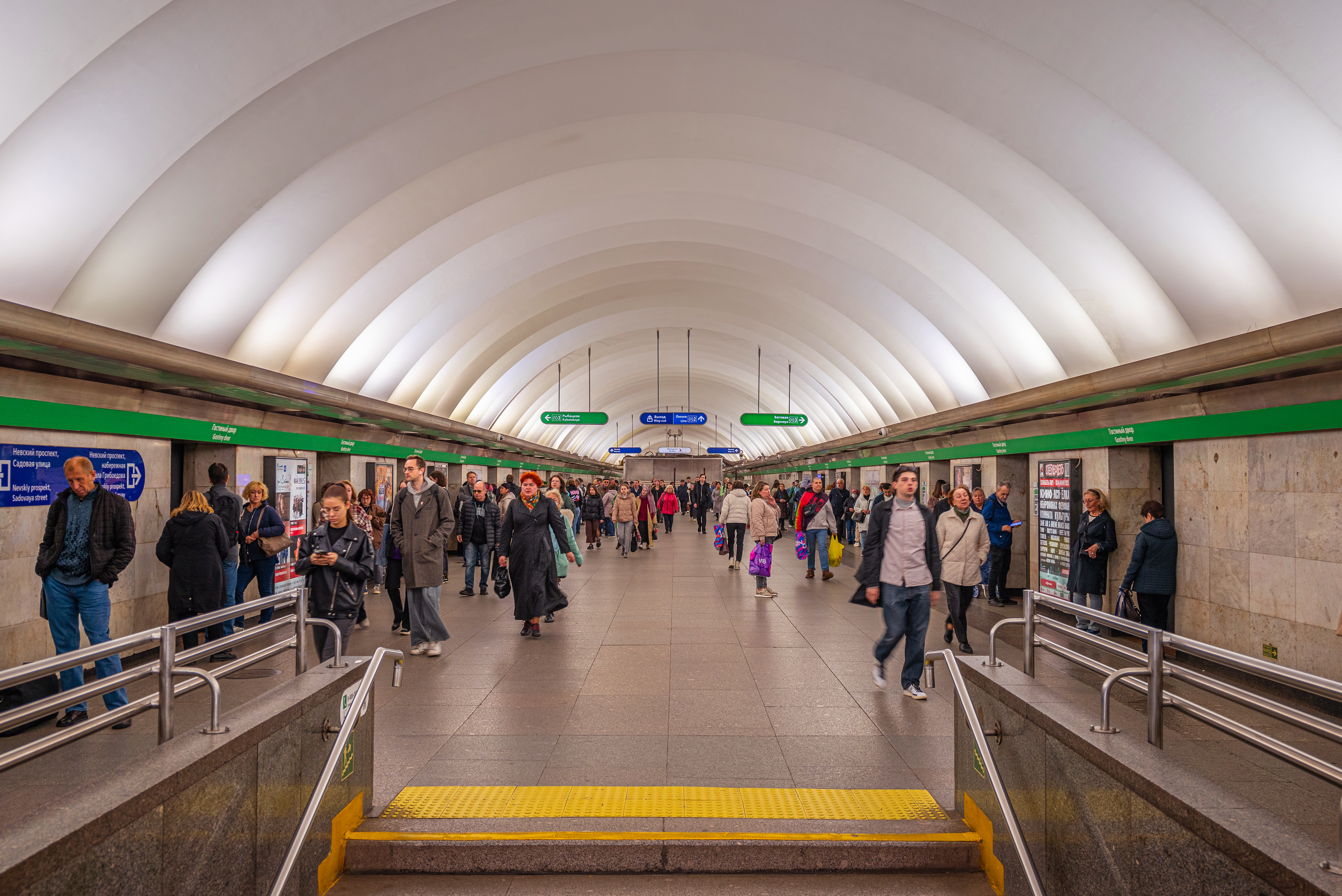
- Station Hall

General information
- Location: Tsentralny District; Saint Petersburg; Russia
- Coordinates: 59°56′03″N 30°20′02″E
- System: Saint Petersburg Metro station
- Owner: Saint Petersburg Metro
- Line: Nevsko–Vasileostrovskaya Line
- Platforms: 1 (Island platform)
- Tracks: 2

Construction
- Structure type: Underground
- Depth: ≈56 m (184 ft)

History
- Opened: November 3, 1967

Services
Preceding station	Saint Petersburg Metro	Following station
Vasileostrovskaya towards Begovaya	Line 3	Mayakovskaya towards Rybatskoye
Gorkovskaya towards Parnas	Line 2 transfer at Nevsky Prospekt	Sennaya Ploshchad towards Kupchino
Route map
Location

Gostiny Dvor (Russian: Гости́ный двор) is a station on the Nevsko–Vasileostrovskaya Line of the Saint Petersburg Metro. It was designed by architect C.G. Mayofis, E.S. Belyat, A.K. Andreyev, Ya.E. Moskalenko and C.P Schyukin and opened on November 3, 1967. It has two exits - one at the intersection between the Griboyedov Canal and Nevsky Prospect and another inside the northern side of the Gostinyi Dvor mall. The latter exit has an entrance that allows the commuters to enter the mall directly. The station also linked to the Nevsky Prospekt metro station via a transfer corridor and a set of escalators. The station is the busiest station on the line and one of the busiest stations in the entire St. Petersburg Metro.

== Local landmarks ==
The station is in close proximity to various landmarks, including the Church of the Savior on Blood, Kazan Cathedral and the Russian Museum. It was formerly the closest station to the Hermitage, Saint Isaac's Cathedral, Admiralty, Summer Garden and Bronze Horseman, until the Admiralteyskaya station opened in 2011.

== Escalator repair ==
From August 2008 to August 31, 2009, the station entrance escalators were closed to repair damage caused by leaks resulting from deterioration and corrosion caused by groundwater. Metrostroy remodeled the design to better control the flow of water. During repairs, passengers had to use the Nevsky Prospekt station entrance to reach Gostiny Dvor escalators and an exit to Gostiny Dvor.
