= Chernyshevskaya =

Saint Petersburg Metro Station

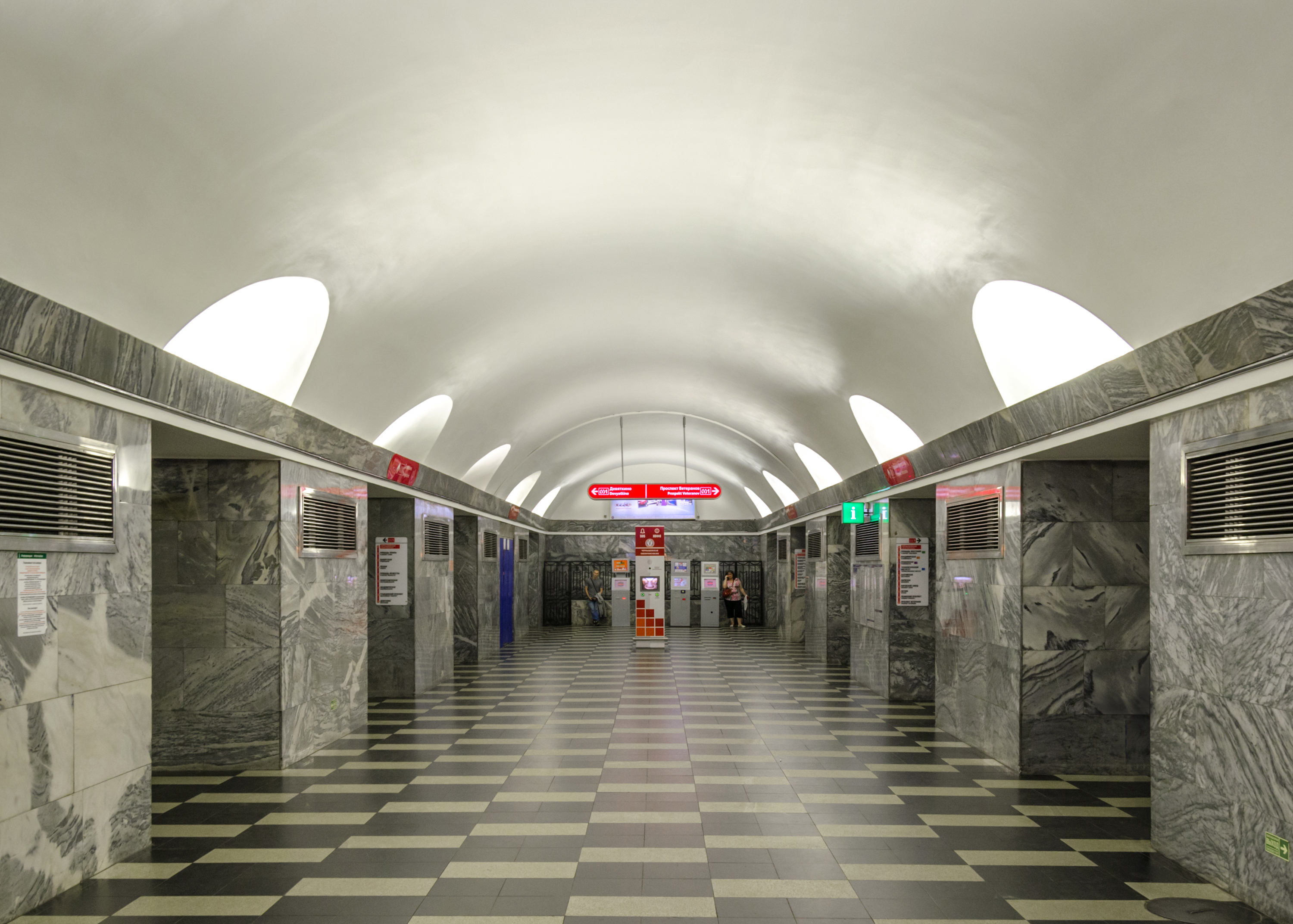
- Central hall

General information
- Location: Tsentralny District; Saint Petersburg; Russia
- Coordinates: 59.9446°N 30.3598°E
- System: Saint Petersburg Metro station
- Line: Kirovsko–Vyborgskaya Line

Construction
- Structure type: Underground
- Depth: 67 m (220 ft)

History
- Opened: September 1, 1958
- Electrified: Third rail

Services
Preceding station	Saint Petersburg Metro	Following station
Ploshchad Lenina towards Devyatkino	Line 1	Ploshchad Vosstaniya towards Prospekt Veteranov
Route map
Location

Chernyshevskaya (Russian: Черныше́вская) is a station on the Kirovsko-Vyborgskaya Line of Saint Petersburg Metro, opened on September 1, 1958. It is a deep underground pylon station at 67 metres (220 ft) depth with a short central hall. The station is named after Chernyshevsky Prospekt, which is in turn named after Russian materialist philosopher and writer Nikolai Chernyshevsky. This station was part of the second stretch of the Saint Petersburg Metro built.While construction was about to start, a rule was created that no more stations should be ornately decorated, such as the stations between Avtovo and Ploshchad Vosstaniya (the first stretch built).
