= Ploshchad Vosstaniya =

Ploshchad Vosstaniya may refer to:

- Vosstaniya Square, Saint Petersburg
- Ploshchad Vosstaniya (Saint Petersburg Metro), a station on the Kirovsko-Vyborgskaya Line of Saint Petersburg Metro
- Ploshchad Vosstaniya (Kharkiv Metro), former name of Zakhysnykiv Ukrainy station on Kharkiv Metro's Oleksiivska Line
