= Obukhovo (Saint Petersburg Metro) =

Saint Petersburg Metro Station

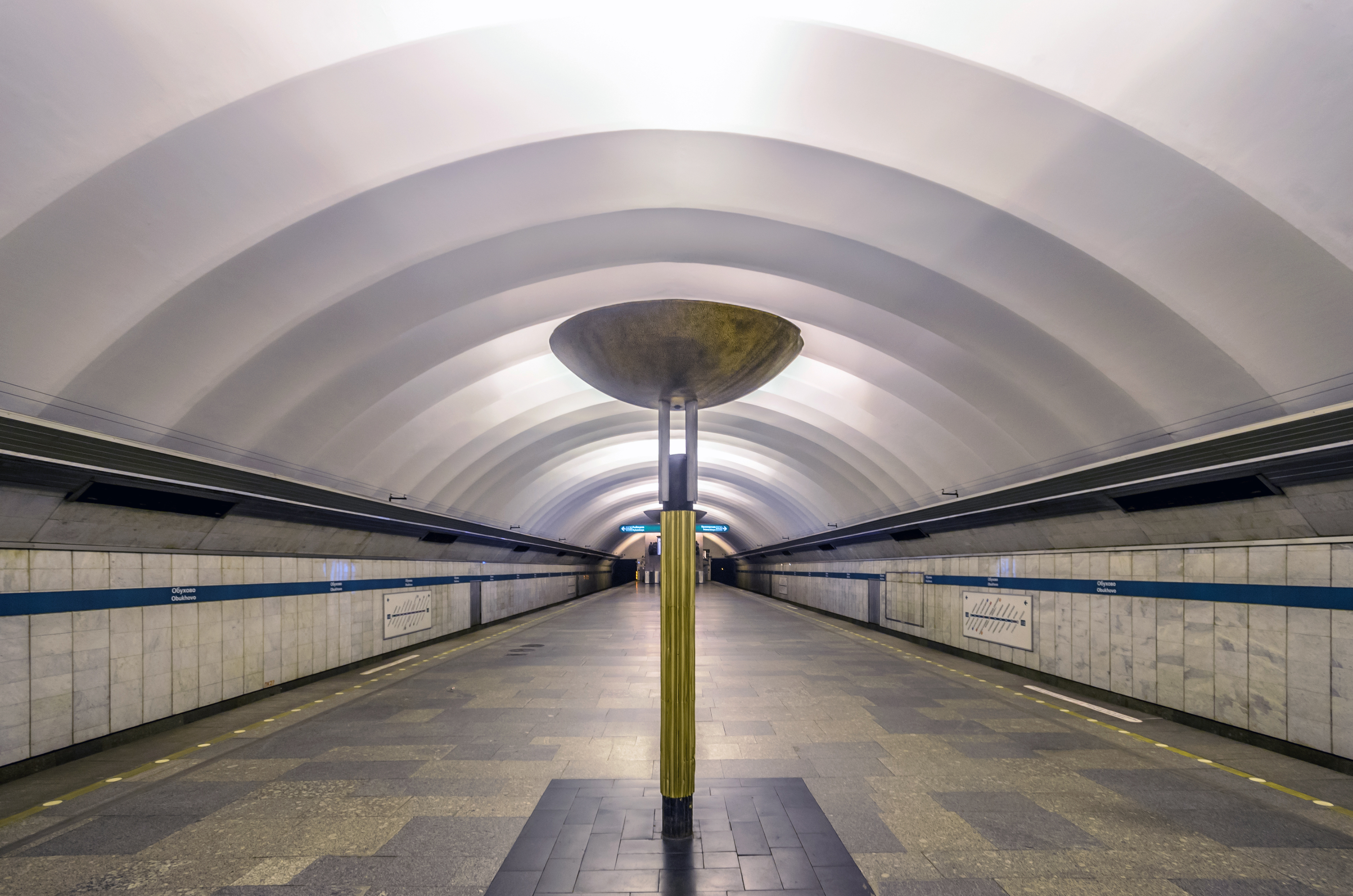
- Station Hall

General information
- Location: Nevsky District; Saint Petersburg; Russia
- Coordinates: 59.848711°N 30.457742°E
- System: Saint Petersburg Metro station
- Owner: Saint Petersburg Metro
- Line: Nevsko–Vasileostrovskaya Line
- Platforms: 1 (Island platform)
- Tracks: 2

Construction
- Structure type: Underground
- Depth: ≈62 m (203 ft)

History
- Opened: July 10, 1981
- Electrified: Third rail

Services
Preceding station	Saint Petersburg Metro	Following station
Proletarskaya towards Begovaya	Line 3	Rybatskoye Terminus
Route map
Location

Obukhovo (Russian: Обу́хово) is a station on the Nevsko–Vasileostrovskaya Line of Saint Petersburg Metro, opened on July 10, 1981.

The station is named after the nearby factory, which hosted a rebellion in 1901.
