= Line 3 (Saint Petersburg Metro) =

Line 3 (Nevsko-Vasileostrovskaya)

Overview
- Status: Operational
- Owner: Saint Petersburg Metro
- Termini: Begovaya; Rybatskoye
- Stations: 12

Service
- Type: Rapid transit
- System: Saint Petersburg Metro

History
- Opened: November 3, 1967; 58 years ago
- Last extension: 2018

Technical
- Line length: 27.7 km (17.2 mi)
- Track gauge: 1,524 mm (5 ft)

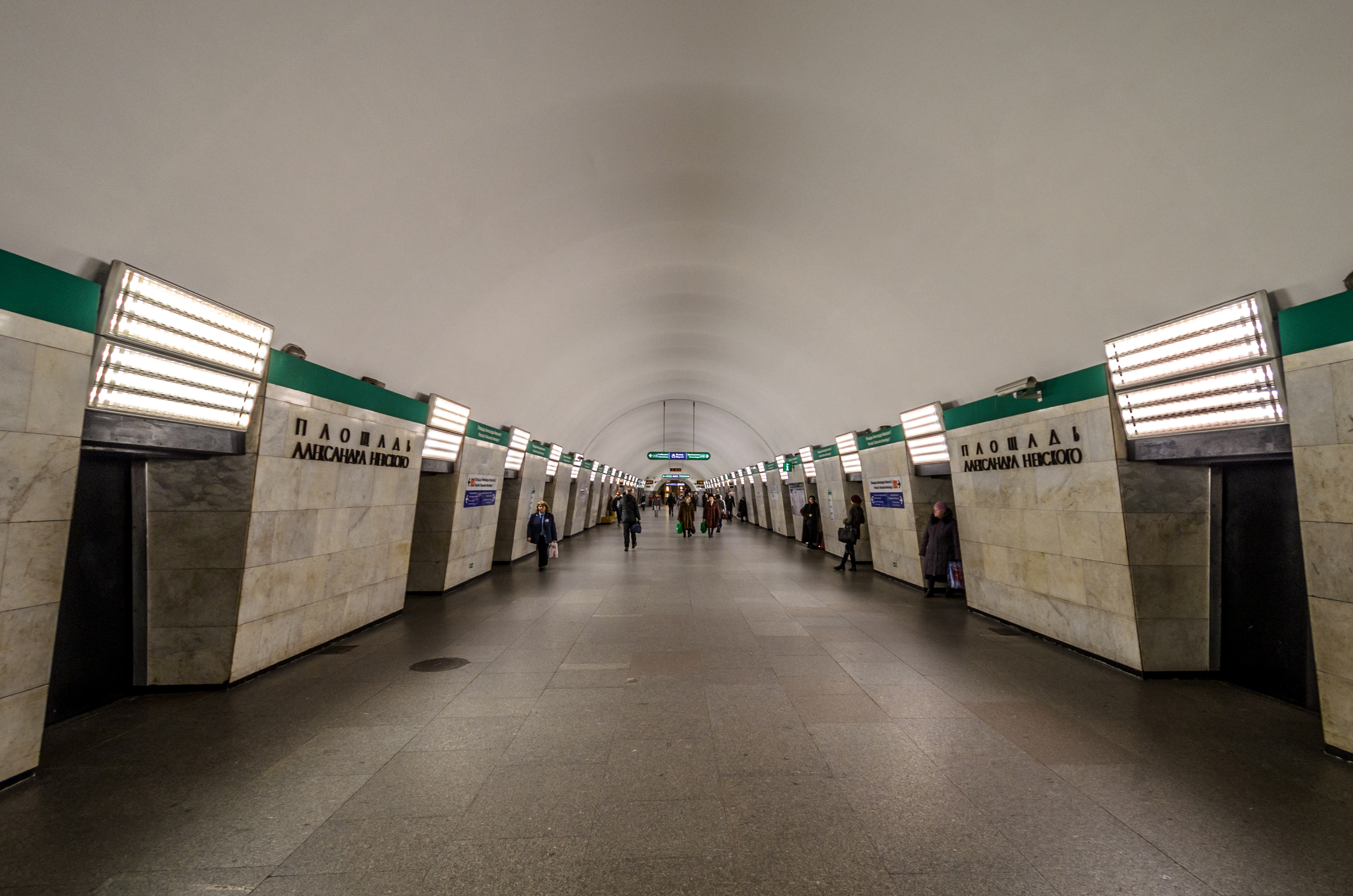
Ploshchad Alexandra Nevskogo I station

Line 3 of the Saint Petersburg Metro, also known as Nevsko-Vasileostrovskaya Line (Russian: Не́вско-Василеостро́вская ли́ния) or Green Line, is a rapid transit line in Saint Petersburg, Russia, which connects city centre with the western and southeastern districts. It was opened in 1967. Since 1994, it has been officially designated as Line 3. It stands out among Saint Petersburg metro lines for two reasons — its stations are almost exclusively of "Horizontal Lift" type and it has the longest inter-station tunnels in the entire system. Metro officials originally intended to add stations in-between the existing ones, but those plans were later abandoned.

The line cuts Saint Petersburg centre on an east–west axis and then turns southeast following the left bank of the Neva River. It is generally coloured green on Metro maps.

== Timeline ==
Segment	Date opened	Length
Vasileostrovskaya to Ploshchad Alexandra Nevskogo	November 3, 1967	6.5 km
Ploshchad Alexandra Nevskogo I to Lomonosovskaya	December 25, 1970	6.3 km
Vasileostrovskaya to Primorskaya	September 29, 1979	2.6 km
Lomonosovskaya to Obukhovo	July 10, 1981	4.0 km
Obukhovo to Rybatskoe	December 28, 1984	3.1 km
Primorskaya to Begovaya	May 26, 2018	5.2 km
Total:	12 Stations	27.7 km

== Transfers ==
Transfer to	At
Line 1 (Saint Petersburg Metro)	Mayakovskaya
Line 2 (Saint Petersburg Metro)	Gostinny Dvor
Line 4 (Saint Petersburg Metro)	Ploshchad Alexandra Nevskogo

Future transfer to Line 5 is planned via Admiralteyskaya.

== Rolling stock ==
The Nevskoe depot (№ 5) serves the line. Previously six carriage Em, Ema, and Emx trains were assigned to the line until 2015 while 81-717/714 and 81-540/541 trains operated until 2018. Line 3 currently uses 81-556/557/558, 81-722/723/724, 81-556.1/557.1/558.1, 81-722.3/723.3/724.3 and 81-556.2/557.2/558.2 trains.

== Recent developments and future plans ==
Admiralteyskaya was opened in 2011 between Gostiny Dvor and Vasileostrovskaya and became a transfer to Line 5. Proletarskaya was closed for reconstruction on August 25, 2005. Originally, it was intended to reopen on February 25, 2007, but the reconstruction was finished ahead of schedule, allowing the station to reopen on November 17, 2006.

The extension of the line north to Novokrestovskaya and Begovaya was opened in 2018.
