= Begovaya (Saint Petersburg Metro) =

Saint Petersburg Metro station

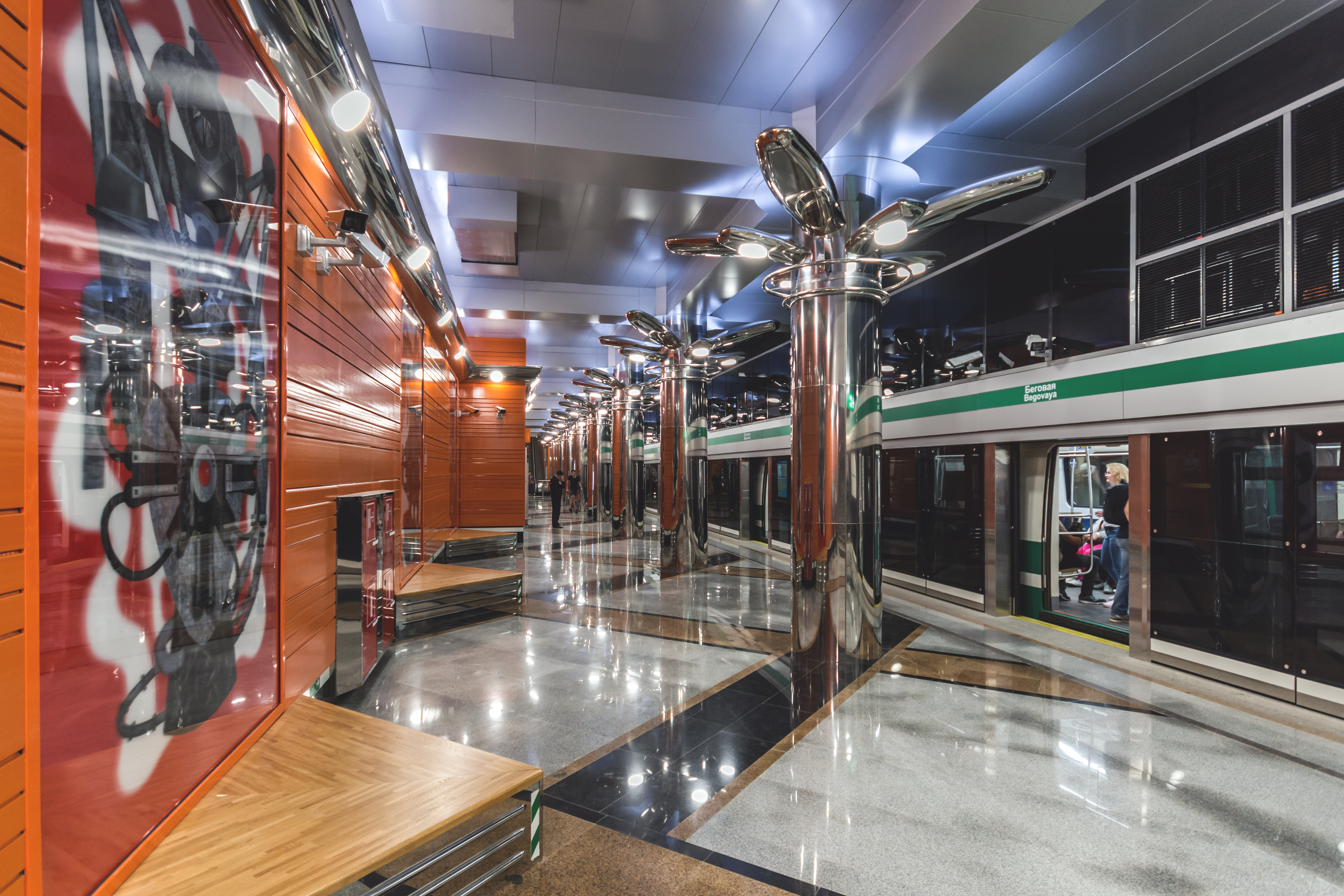

General information
- Location: Savushkina Street, Primorsky District; Saint Petersburg; Russia
- Coordinates: 59°59′14″N 30°12′8″E
- System: Saint Petersburg Metro station
- Operator: Saint Petersburg Metro
- Line: Nevsko–Vasileostrovskaya Line
- Platforms: 2
- Tracks: 2

Construction
- Structure type: Underground closed type station
- Depth: 20 m (66 ft)
- Platform levels: 1
- Cycle facilities: Yes

History
- Opened: 26 May 2018
- Electrified: 825 volts DC

Services
Preceding station	Saint Petersburg Metro	Following station
Terminus	Line 3	Zenit towards Rybatskoye
Location

Begovaya (Russian: Беговая) is a Saint Petersburg Metro station on the Nevsko–Vasileostrovskaya Line (Line 3) of the Saint Petersburg Metro. It opened on 26 May 2018 as a part of the extension of the line to the north from Primorskaya. The extension included Novokrestovskaya station as well. Begovaya is the northern terminus of the line, behind Zenit.

The station is on the right bank of the Neva, in a rectangle bounded by Savushkina Street, Primorsky Avenue. Begovaya Street, and Turistskaya Street.

The name of the station is given on the nearby street.

Until June 23, 2014, the station had the design name "Savushkina Street". Renamed the resolution of the Government of St. Petersburg on June 23, 2014, according to the recommendations of the Toponymic Commission in connection with the location of the exit of the station near Begovaya Street

"Begovaya" is a column multipass station of shallow ground.

Architectural design is associated with the theme of the modern industrial urban environment, characteristic of the station's location area. The architecture of the station was designed by architects N.V. Romashkin-Timanova and U. S. Sergeeva.

The theme of architecture is revealed in the image of decorative lamps arranged on columns, stylized as "propellers."

Their bodies are made of stainless steel. Built-in fluorescent lamps shine upward with reflection. Lamps of round shape shine down and illuminate the platform.

The floors of the vestibules and the station are made of polished granite.

The columns are faced with stainless steel sheets, the walls are covered with ceramic panels with plinths of polished black granite.

For the most complete disclosure of the architectural and artistic concept of the station on the side walls, artistic and decorative glass compositions designed in the scale of station finishing were designed. Art panels were made using the technology of lenticular printing (artist I.I. Baranova).

For the safety of passengers, glazed fences with automatic sliding doors are installed along the edges of the platforms. The exit of passengers is carried out to the right side, as well as at the other metro stations with onshore platforms.

The stations "Begovaya" and "Zenit" are connected by a double-track tunnel.
