= Rybatskoye (Saint Petersburg Metro) =

Saint Petersburg Metro Station

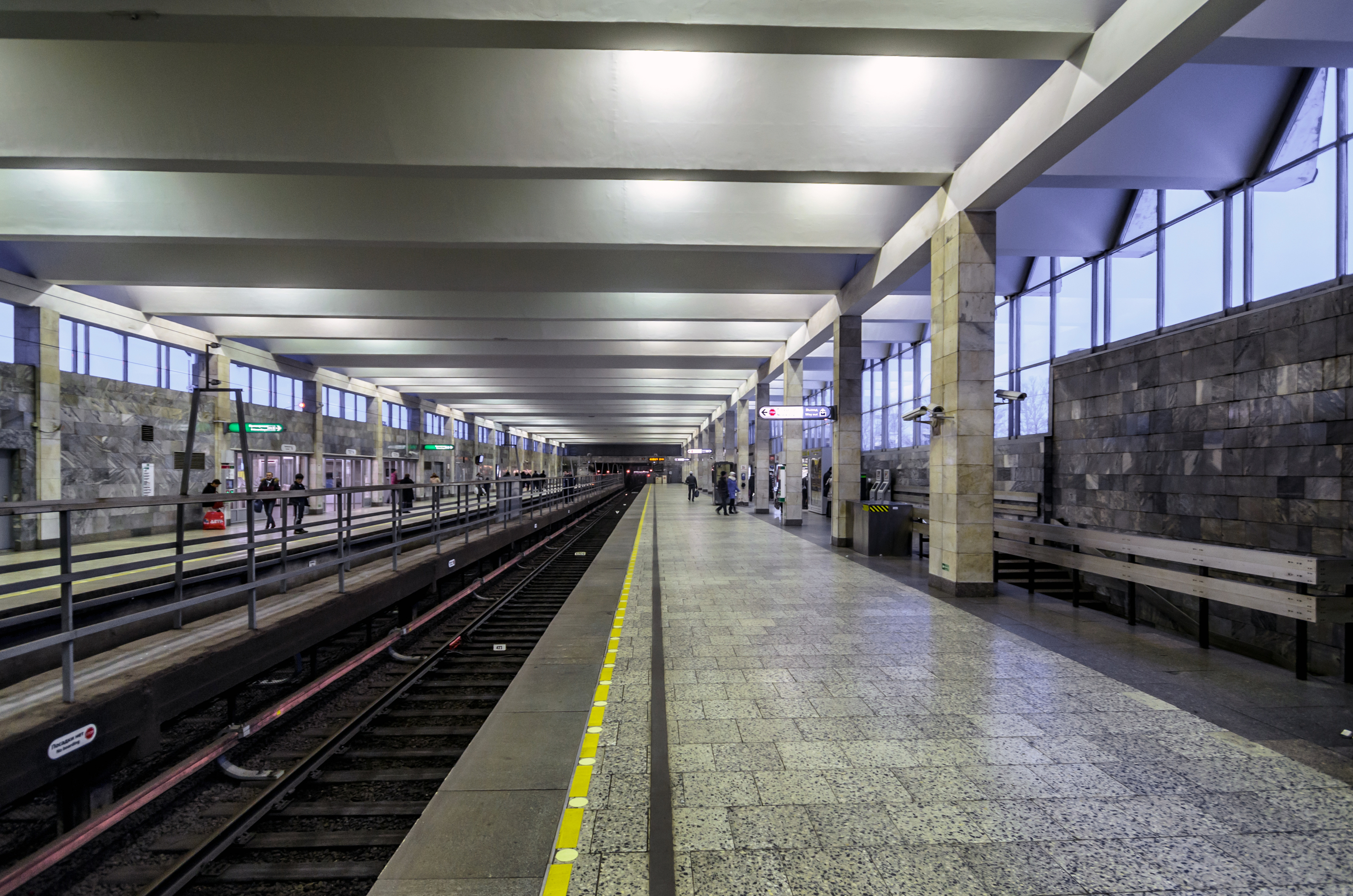
- Station Hall

General information
- Location: Nevsky District; Saint Petersburg; Russia
- Coordinates: 59.830878°N 30.500117°E
- System: Saint Petersburg Metro station
- Operator: Saint Petersburg Metro
- Line: Nevsko–Vasileostrovskaya Line
- Platforms: 2 (Side platforms)
- Tracks: 2

Construction
- Structure type: Aboveground

History
- Opened: 28 December 1984
- Electrified: Third rail

Services
Preceding station	Saint Petersburg Metro	Following station
Obukhovo towards Begovaya	Line 3	Terminus
Location

Rybatskoye (Russian: Рыба́цкое) is a station on the Nevsko–Vasileostrovskaya Line of Saint Petersburg Metro, opened on 28 December 1984. The name Rybatskoye translates directly to "Fisherman's."

== Design features ==
Rybatskoye is one of the 5 stations of the St. Petersburg metro that are located at ground level, with the other four being Kupchino, Devyatkino, Parnas and Shushary. Like with the other four stations, behind Rybatskoye begins the depot of the same name, which serves lines 3, 4, and more recently, also line 5. Furthermore, it's also adjacent to the eponymous railway station on the Saint Petersburg–Moscow railway.
