= Mezhdunarodnaya =

Mezhdunarodnaya:

- Mezhdunarodnaya (Moscow Metro)
- Mezhdunarodnaya (Saint Petersburg Metro)
