= Bukharestskaya (Saint Petersburg Metro) =

Saint Petersburg Metro Station

Coordinates: 59°53′01″N 30°22′10″E

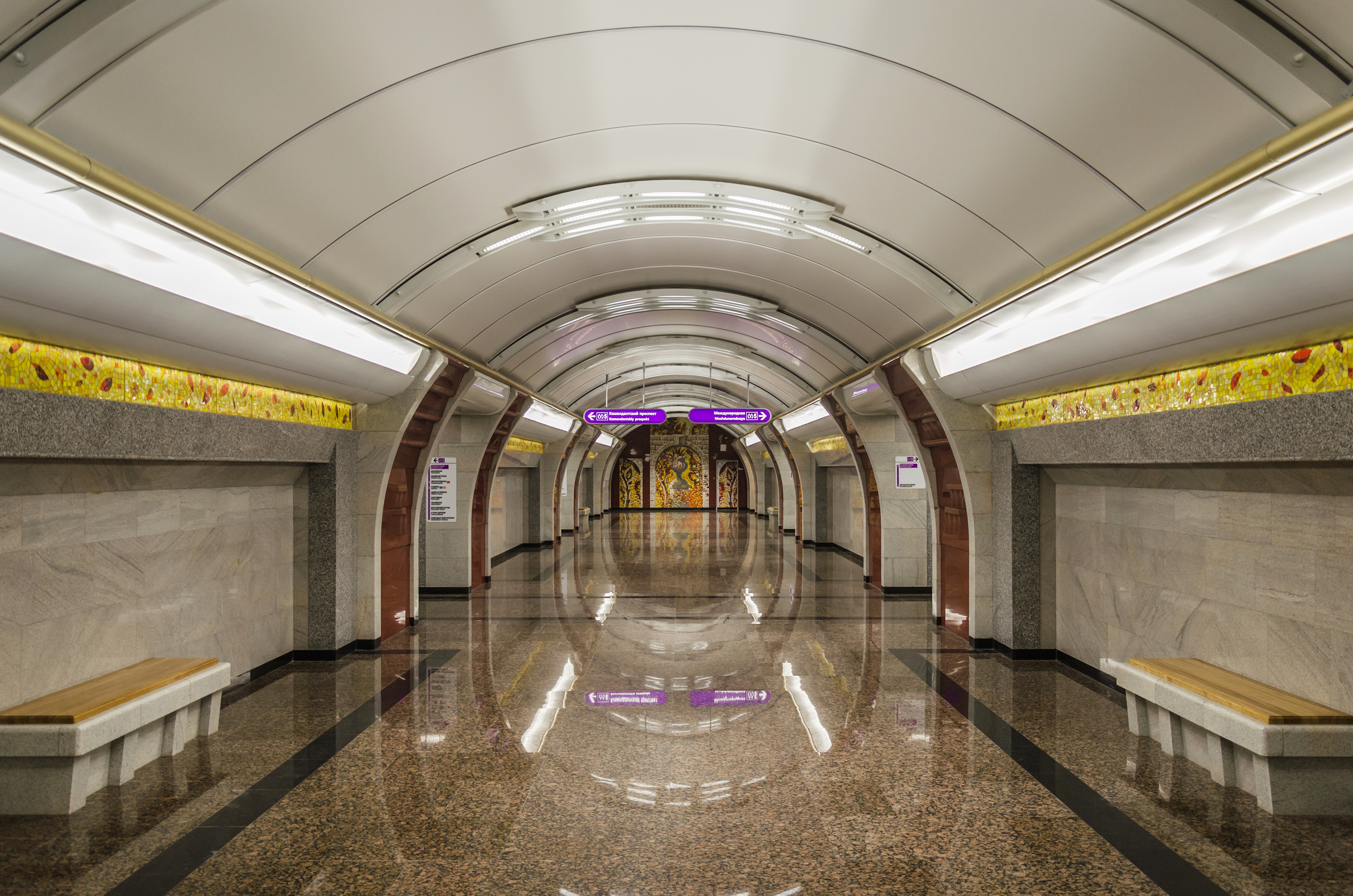
- Station hall

General information
- Location: Frunzensky District; Saint Petersburg; Russia
- System: Saint Petersburg Metro station
- Operator: Saint Petersburg Metro
- Line: Frunzensko–Primorskaya Line
- Platforms: 1 (island platform)
- Tracks: 2

Construction
- Structure type: Underground
- Depth: 65 metres (213 ft)
- Parking: Yes
- Cycle facilities: Yes

History
- Opened: 28 December 2012
- Electrified: 825 V DC low third rail

Services
Preceding station	Saint Petersburg Metro	Following station
Volkovskaya towards Komendantsky Prospekt	Line 5	Mezhdunarodnaya towards Shushary
Route map
Location

Bukharestskaya (Russian: Бухарестская) is a station on the Frunzensko-Primorskaya Line (Line 5) of the Saint Petersburg Metro. It was opened on December 28, 2012 together with Mezhdunarodnaya as an extension of the Frunzensko-Primorskaya Line.

The station is located on the southeastern side of the line, between Volkovskaya and Mezhdunarodnaya Stations. At the moment the station was opened, Mezhdunarodnaya served as the southeastern terminus of the line. Bukharestskaya is built under the corner of Bukharestskaya Street (hence the name) and Salova Street, in Frunzensky District.

Bukharestskaya is a pylon station. The construction started in 1986 but was frozen, and restarted in the 2000s. It was originally planned to be opened in August 2012, but the opening was postponed until December 2012, since the escalators were not delivered on time.

There have been several proposals to rename the station, however, the name was kept, since the decoration of the station, commemorating the city of Bucharest, was ready in advance, and it was unreasonable to make new design of the station.

The station lobby is built in the shopping mall "Continent".

== Transport ==
Buses: 36, 54, 57, 59, 74, 76, 91, 117, 856. Trams: 25, 43, 45, 49.
