= Dunayskaya (Saint Petersburg Metro) =

Saint Petersburg Metro Station

Coordinates: 59°50′25″N 30°24′37″E

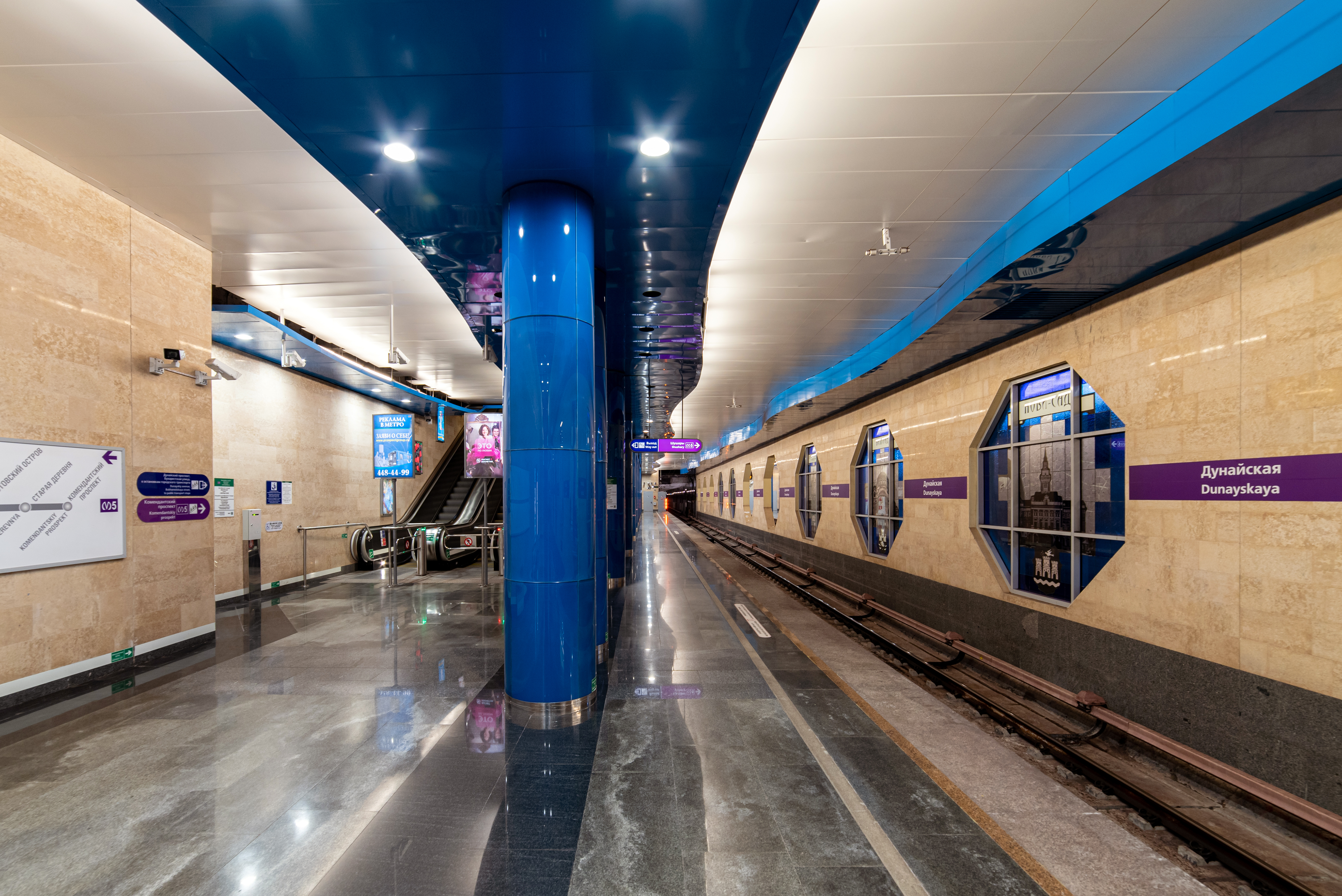

General information
- System: Saint Petersburg Metro station
- Operator: Saint Petersburg Metro
- Line: Frunzensko–Primorskaya Line
- Platforms: 2
- Tracks: 2

Construction
- Structure type: Shallow column tri-vault
- Depth: 27 metres (89 ft)
- Parking: No
- Cycle facilities: Yes

Other information
- Station code: ДУ

History
- Opened: 3 October 2019
- Electrified: Third rail

Services
Preceding station	Saint Petersburg Metro	Following station
Prospekt Slavy towards Komendantsky Prospekt	Line 5	Shushary Terminus
Location

Dunayskaya (Russian: Дунайская) is a Saint Petersburg Metro station on the Frunzensko-Primorskaya Line (Line 5) of the Saint Petersburg Metro. It was opened on 3 October 2019 as a part of the extension of the line to the south from Mezhdunarodnaya. The extension also included Prospekt Slavy and Shushary stations. Dunayskaya is between Prospekt Slavy and Shushary.

The station is in the Balkansky Okrug of the Frunzensky District of Saint Petersburg at the corner of Bukharestskaya Ulitsa and Dunaysky Prospekt. It takes its name from Dunaysky Prospekt, which is named for the Danube River.

== Design and layout ==
Dunayskaya is a three-span, shallow-column station with two side platforms.

The theme of the station is the “Blue Danube” and the color blue is featured throughout. The interior is decorated with stained glass with images of cities along the Danube, including Vienna, Budapest, Belgrade, Linz, and Regensburg.

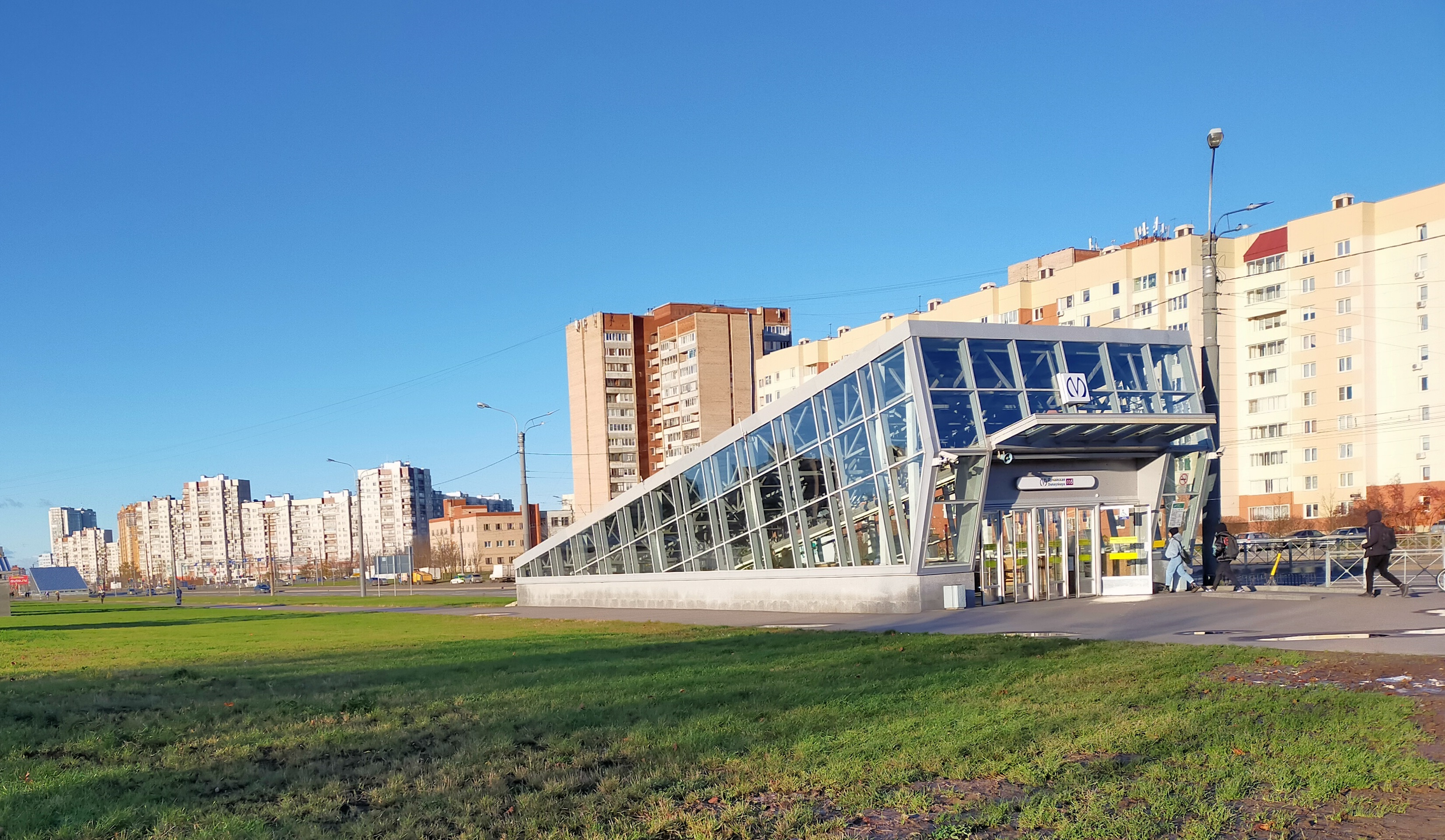
South entrance to the station

There are two station lobbies. The north lobby is at the corner of Bukharestskaya Ulitsa and Dunaysky Prospekt, while the south lobby is at Bukharestskaya Ulitsa and Ulitsa Yaroslava Gasheka (Jaroslav Hašek Street).

== Transport ==
Buses: 53, 56, 57, 197A, 241, 326. Trams: 45, 49, 62.
