= Saint Petersburg Metro =

Rapid transit system in Russia

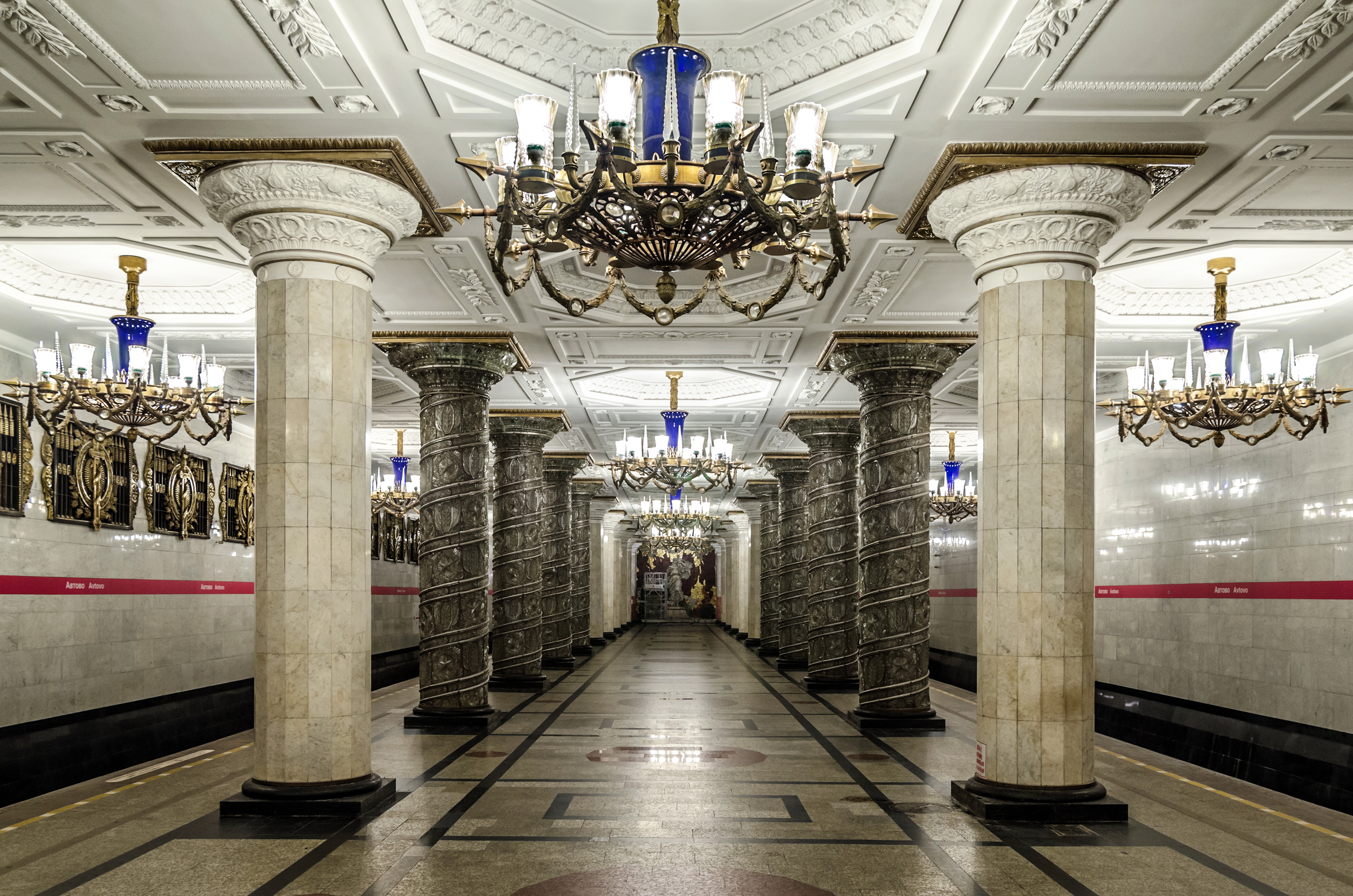
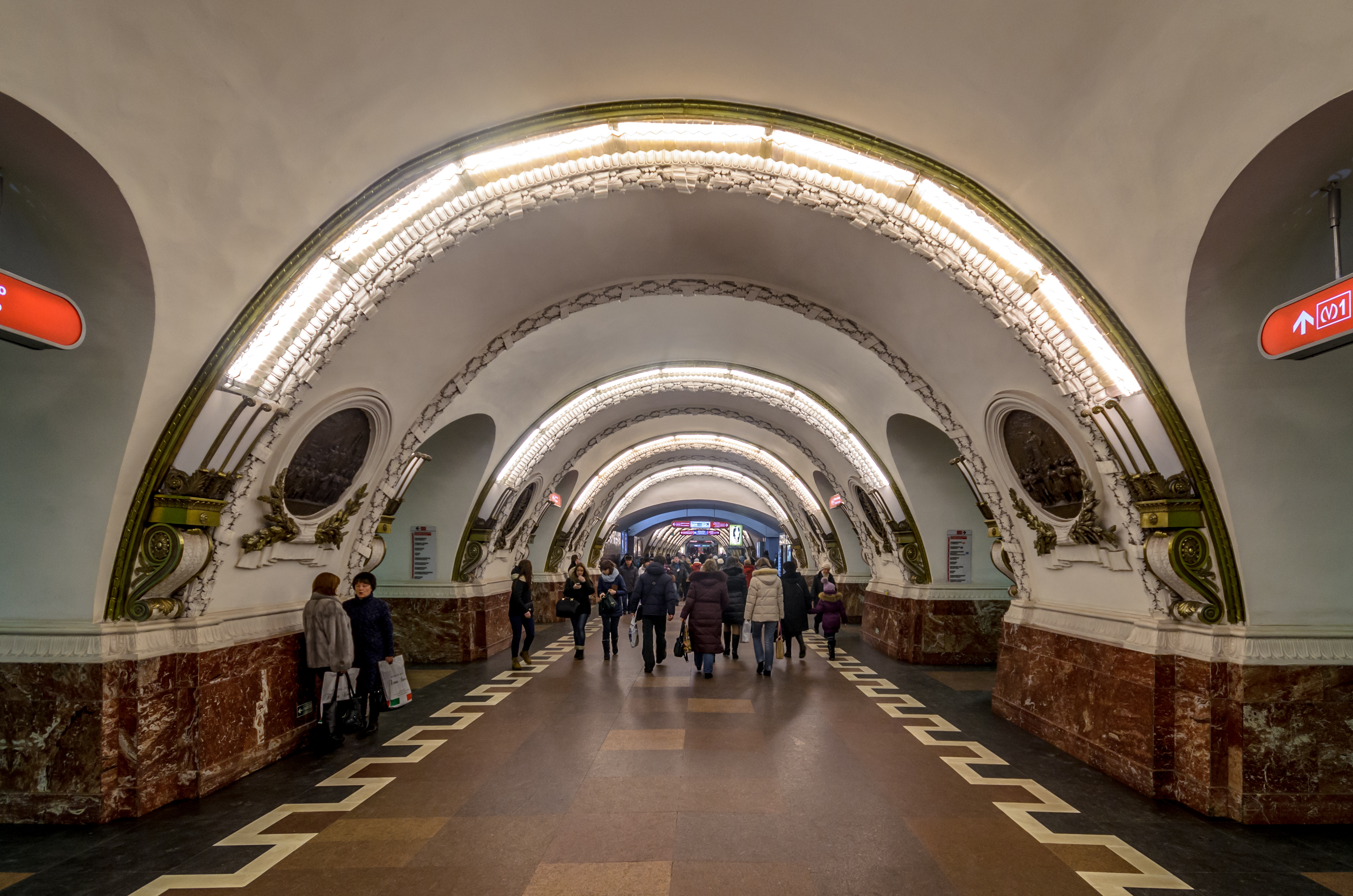
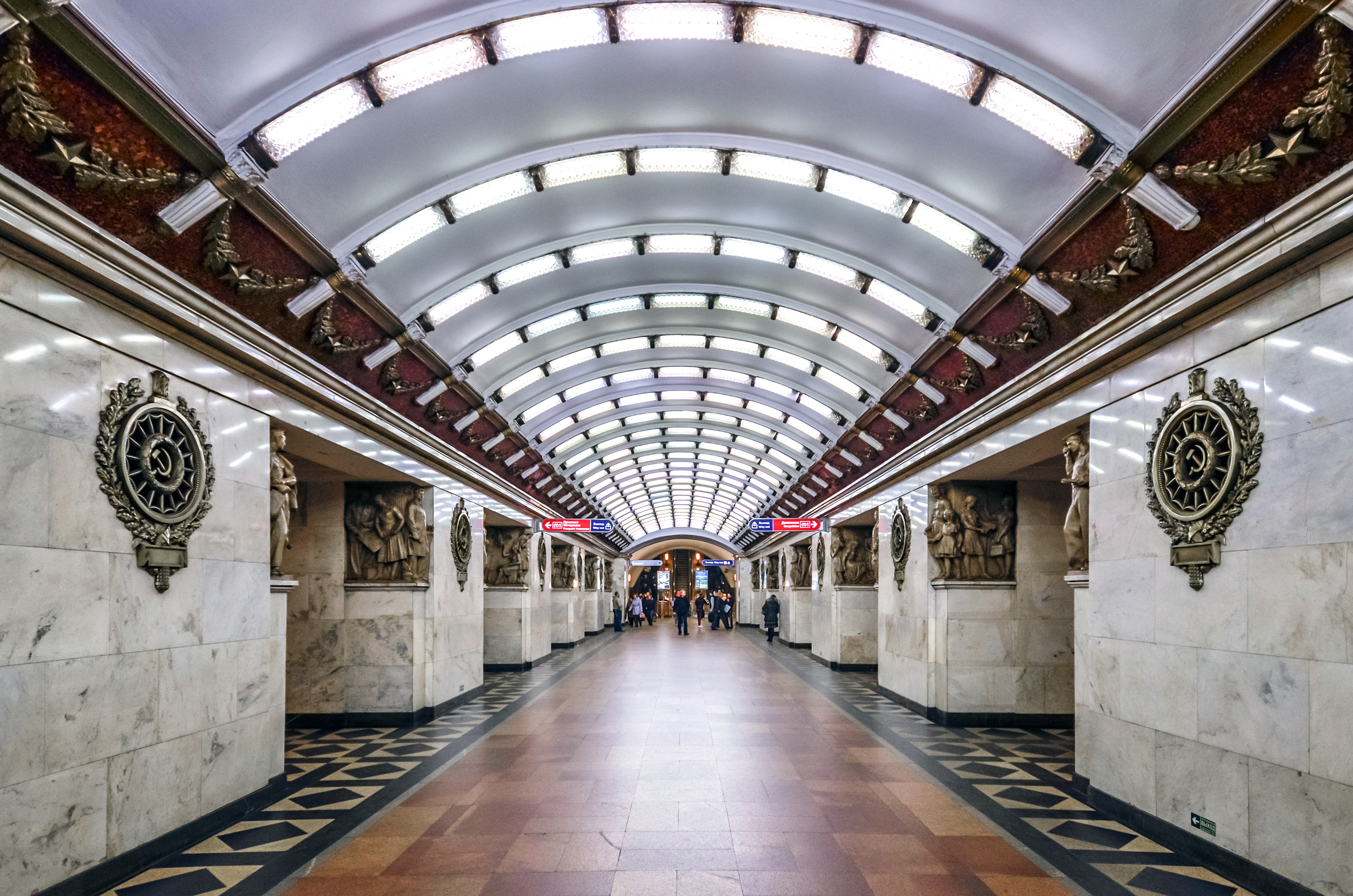
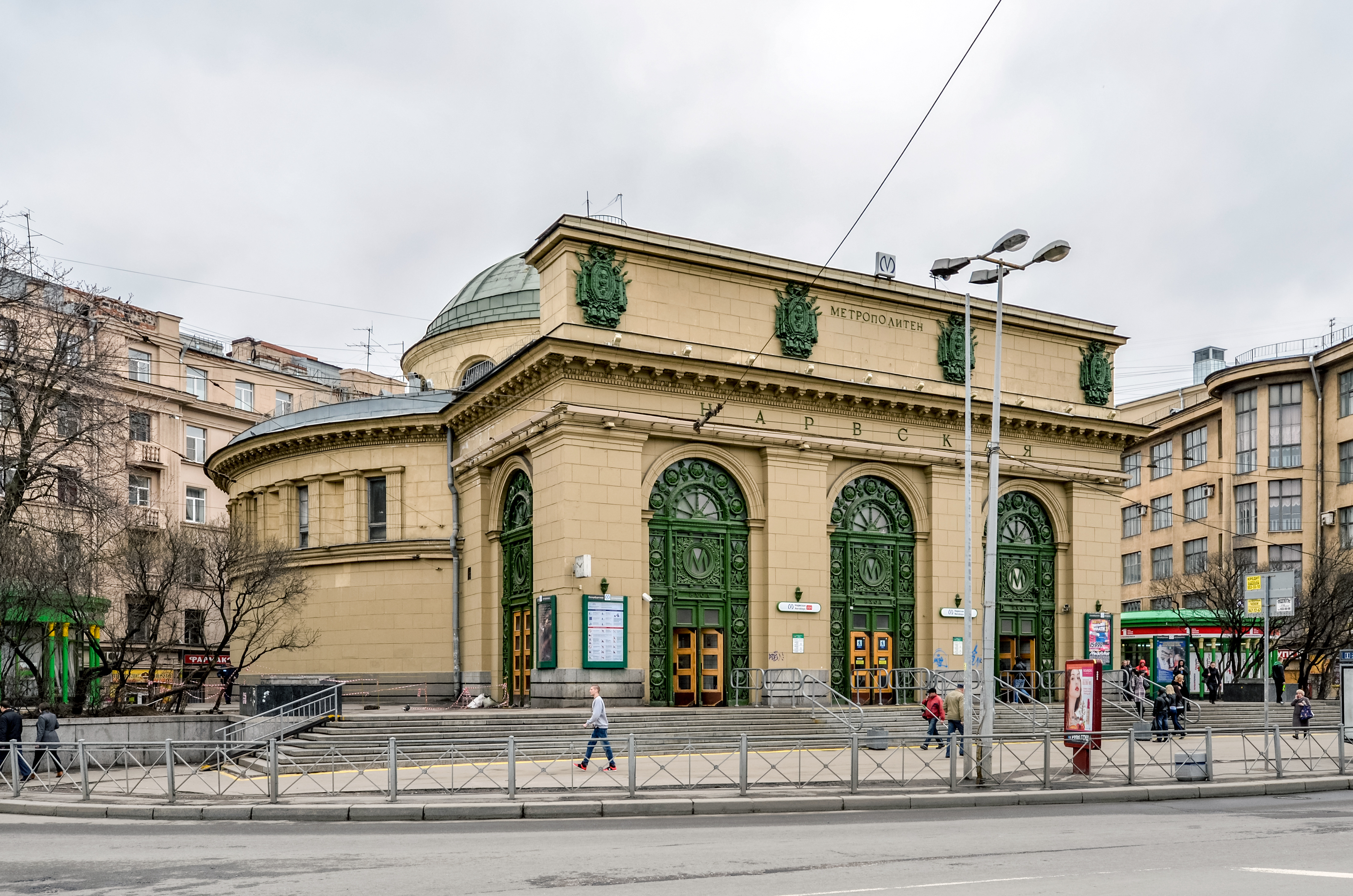
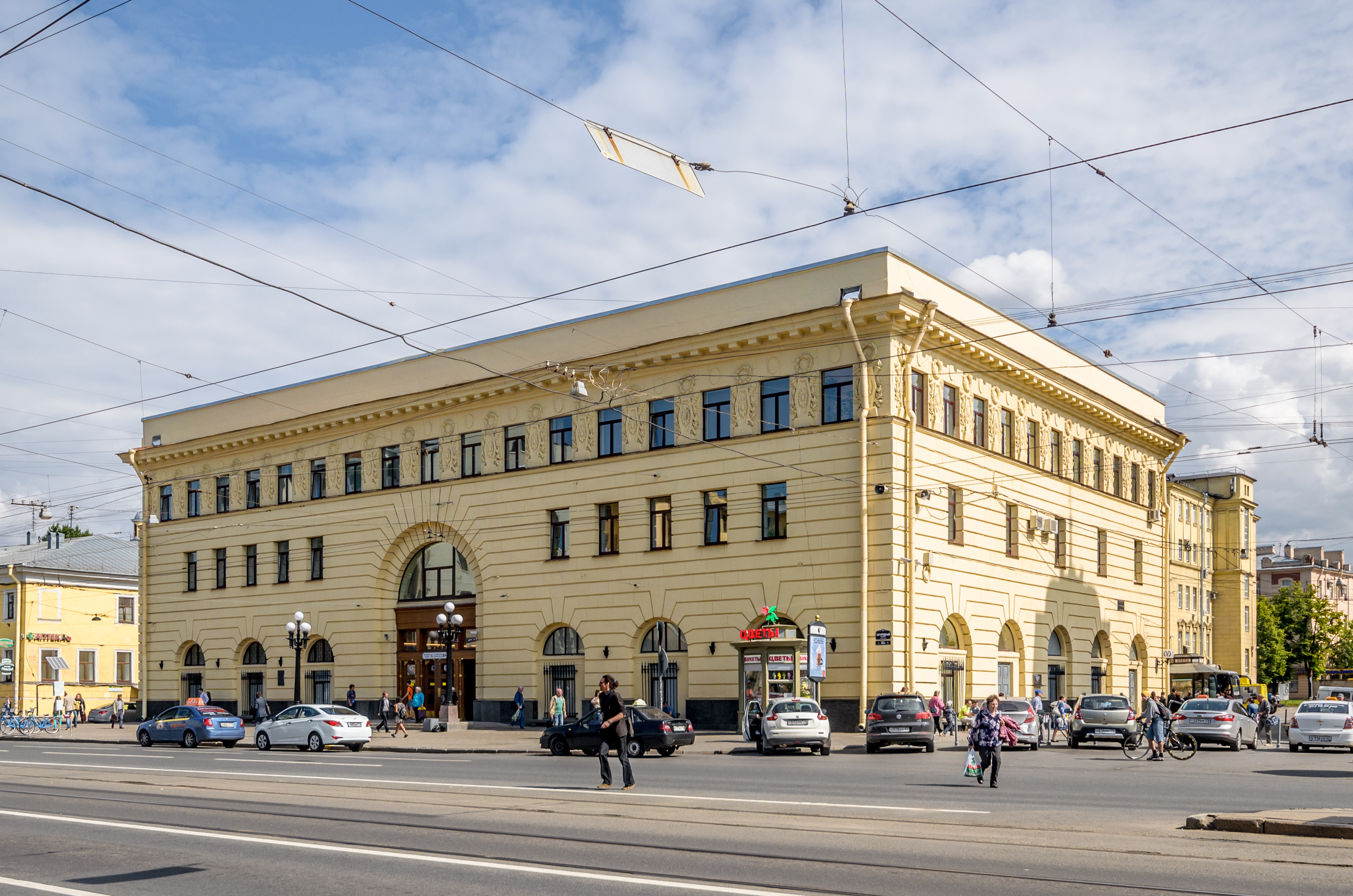
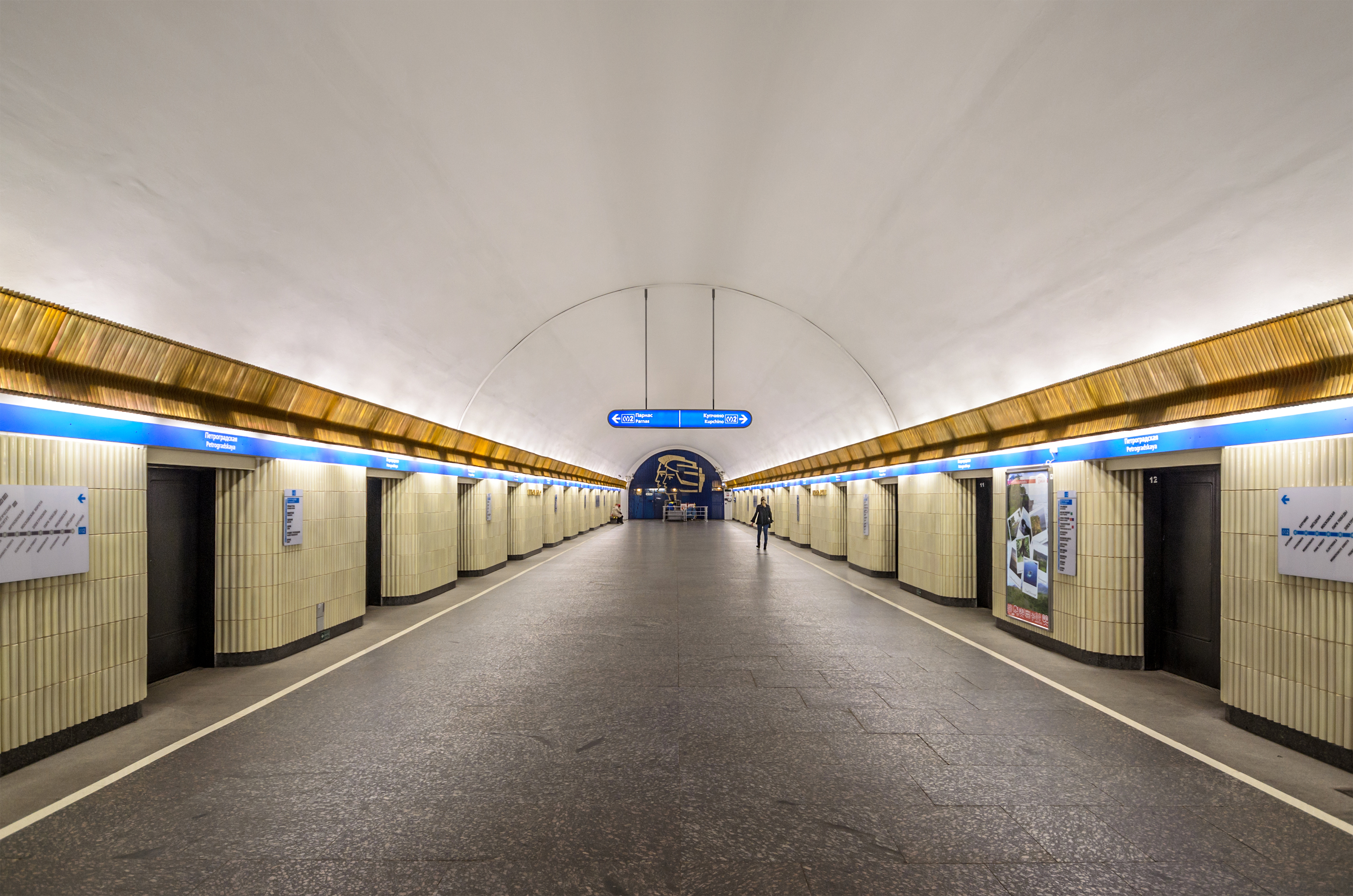
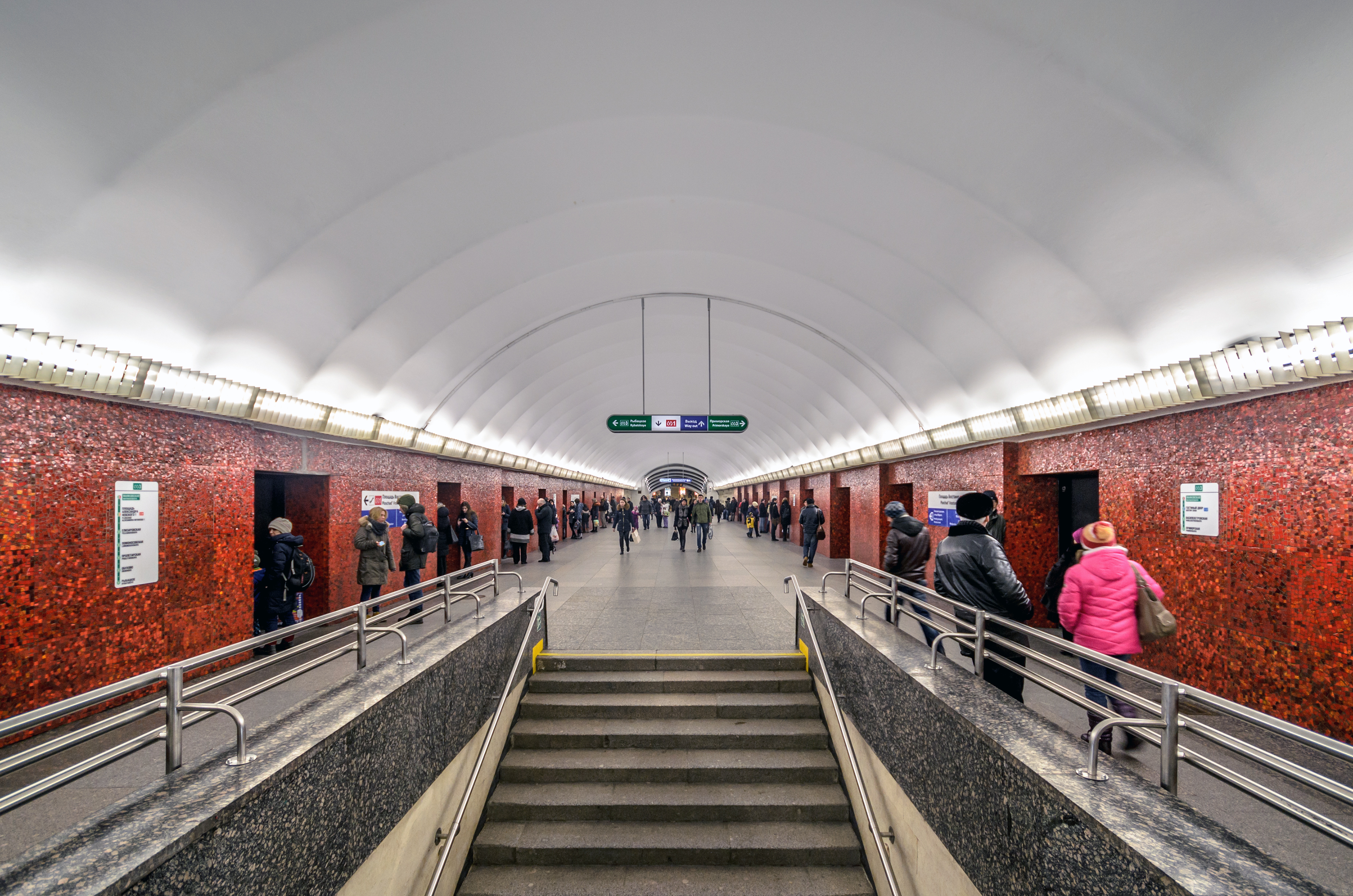
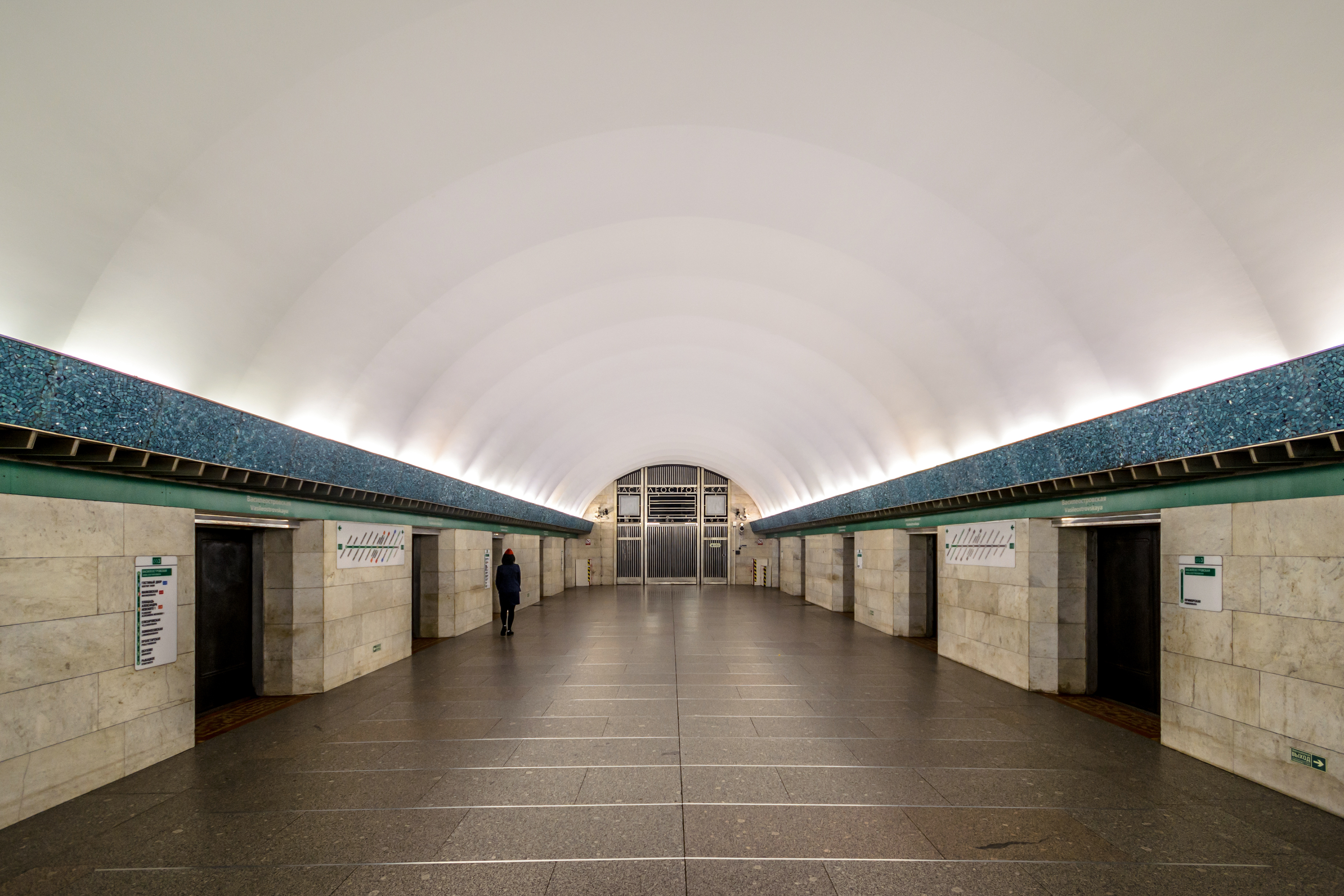
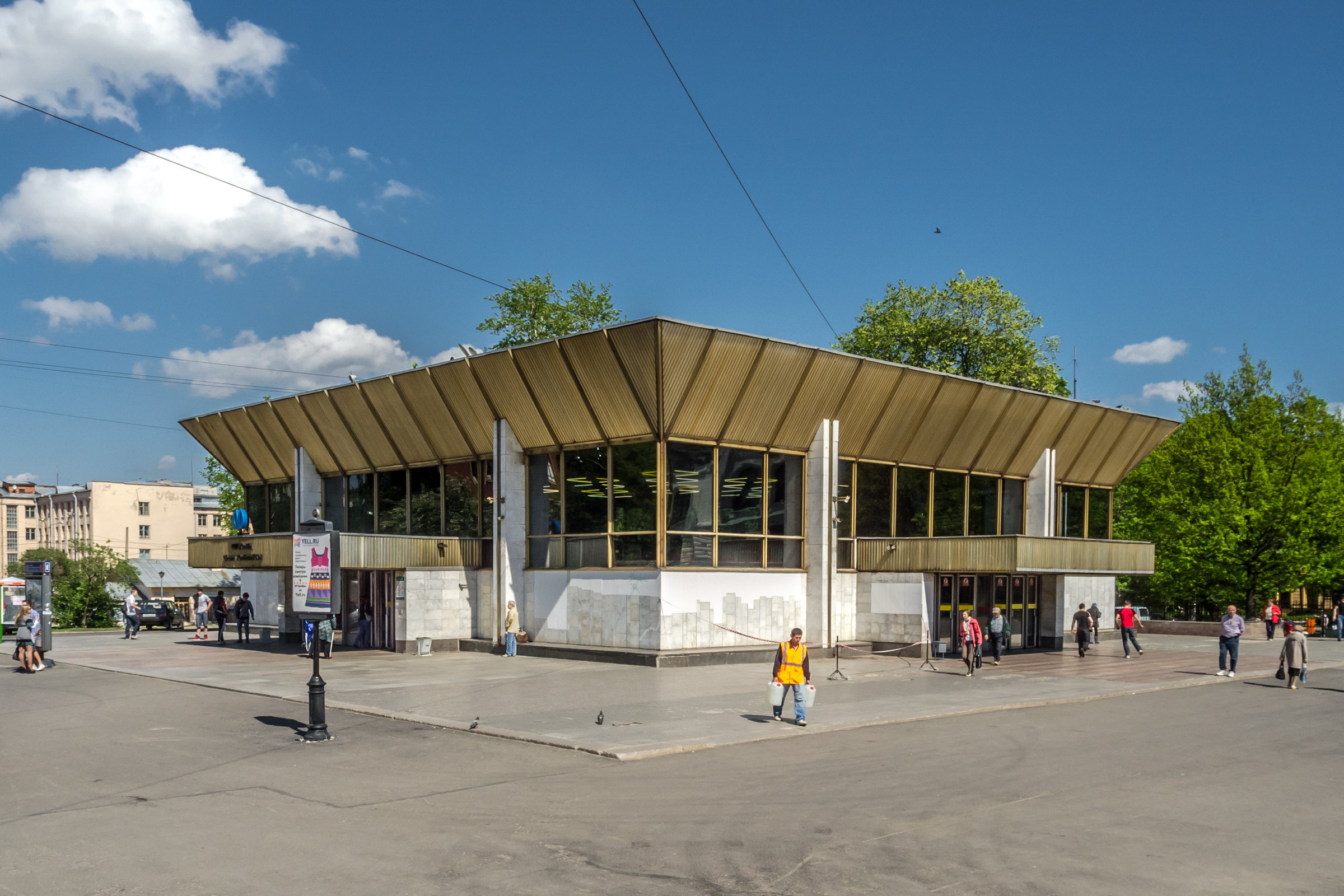
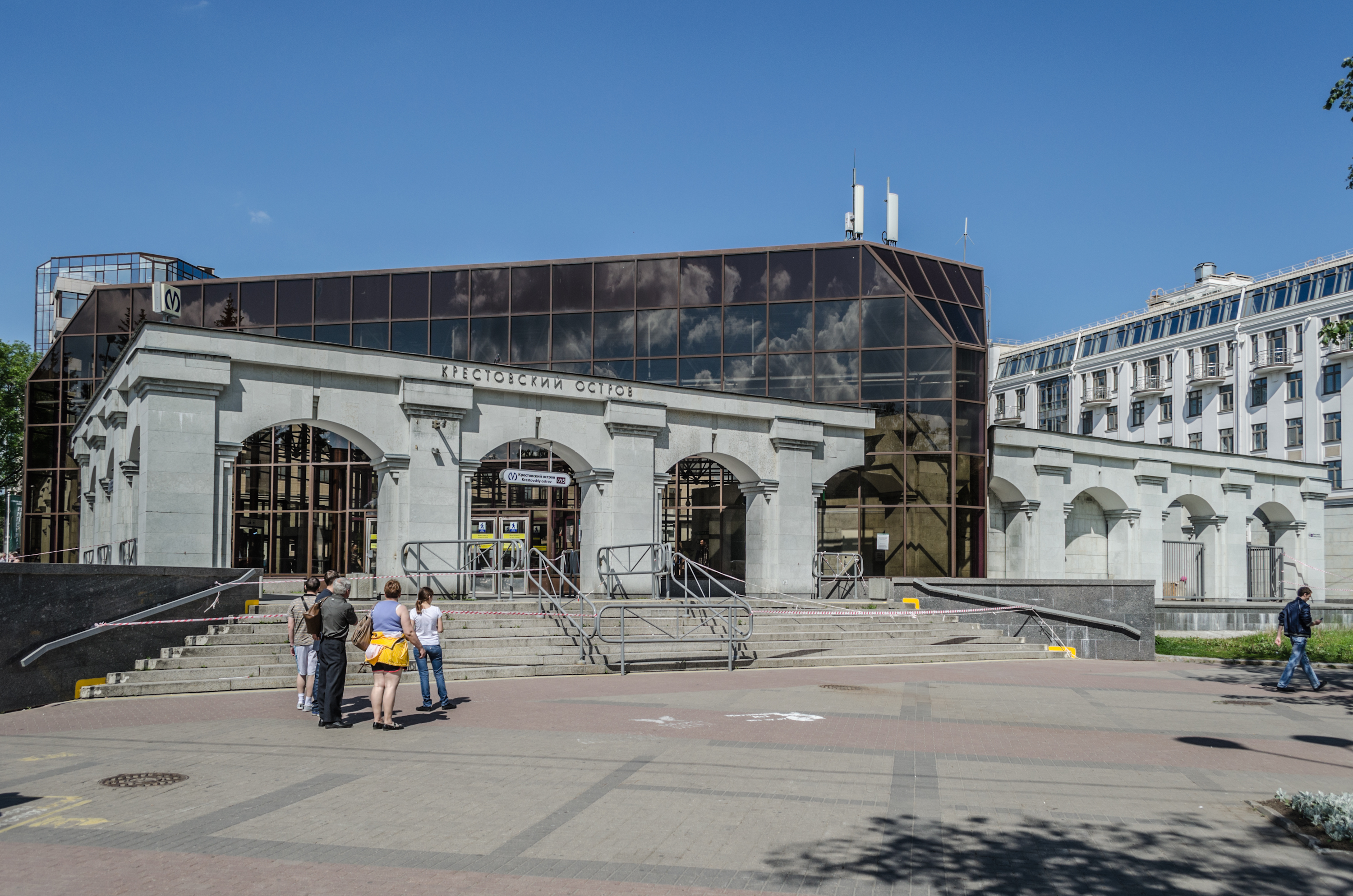
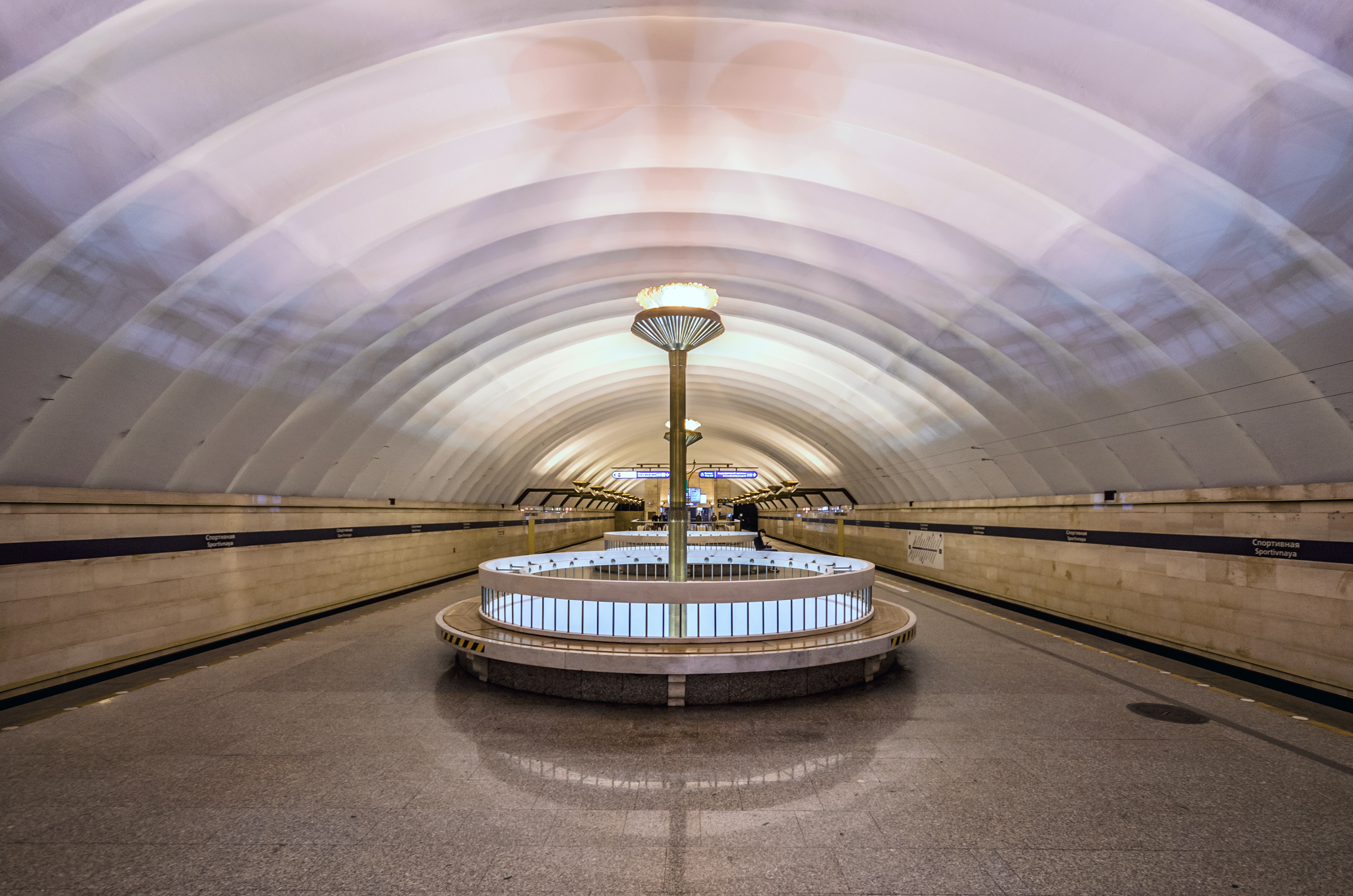
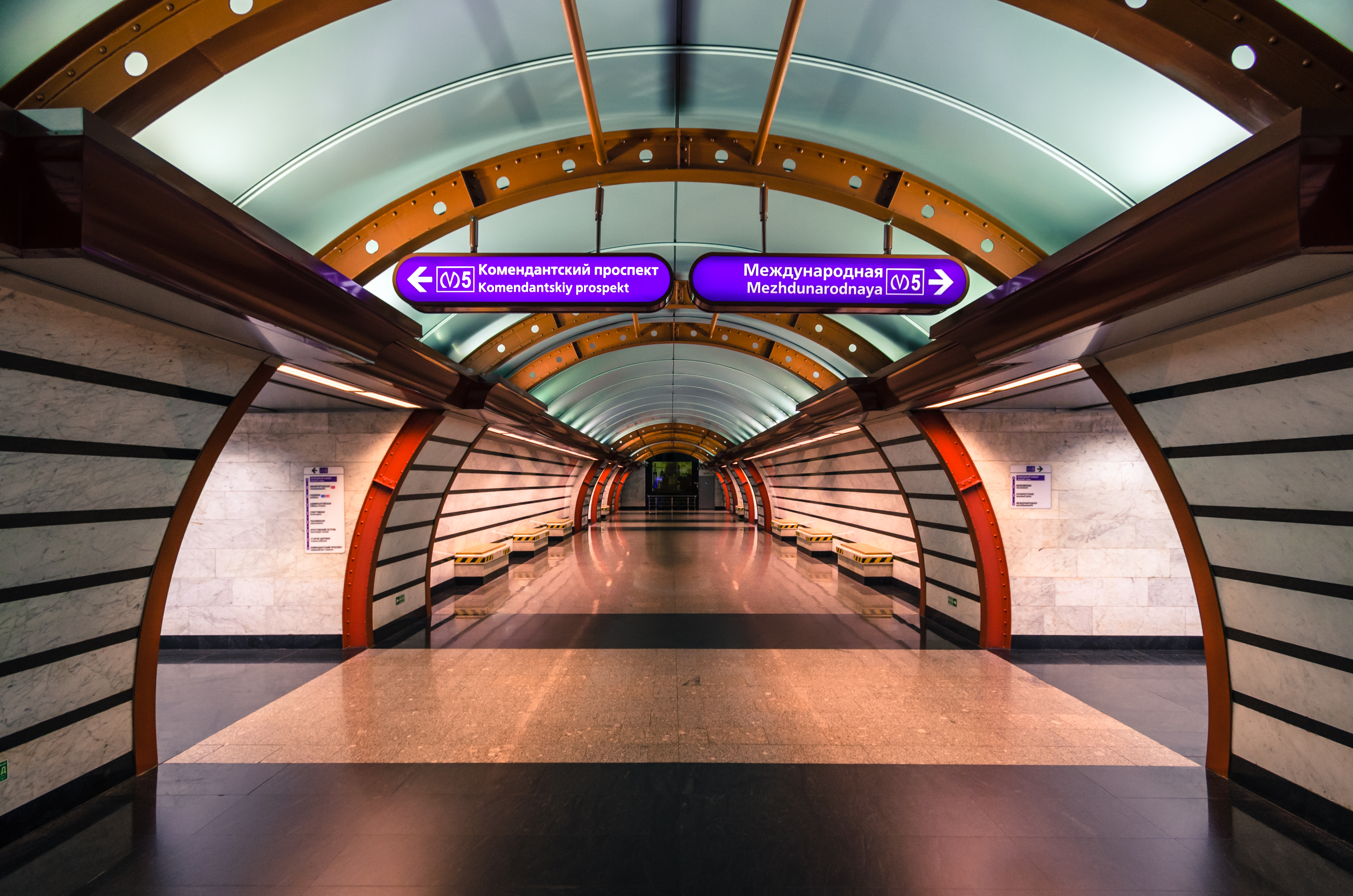
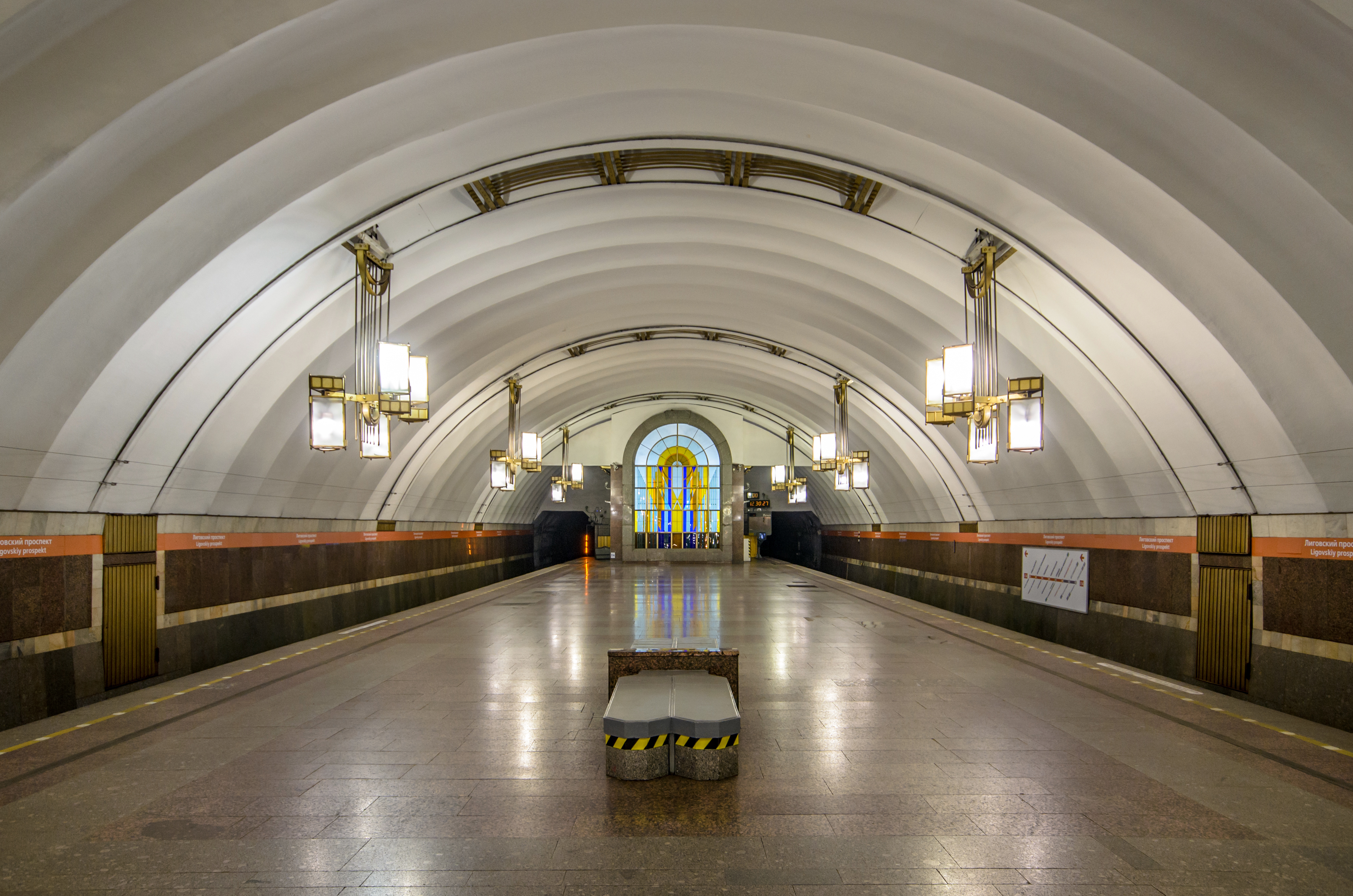
- Stations of Saint Petersburg Metro

Overview
- Native name: Петербургский метрополитен Peterburgskiy metropoliten
- Locale: Saint Petersburg and Leningrad Oblast, Russia
- Transit type: Rapid transit
- Number of lines: 6 (9 planned)
- Number of stations: 75 (126 planned)
- Daily ridership: 1.87 million
- Annual ridership: 686.1 million (2024)
- Website: www.metro.spb.ru

Operation
- Began operation: 15 November 1955; 71 years ago
- Operator: Peterburgsky Metropoliten

Technical
- System length: 131 km (81.4 mi)
- Track gauge: 1,520 mm (4 ft 11 27/32 in)
- Electrification: 850 V DC third rail
- Average speed: 40 km/h (25 mph)
System map
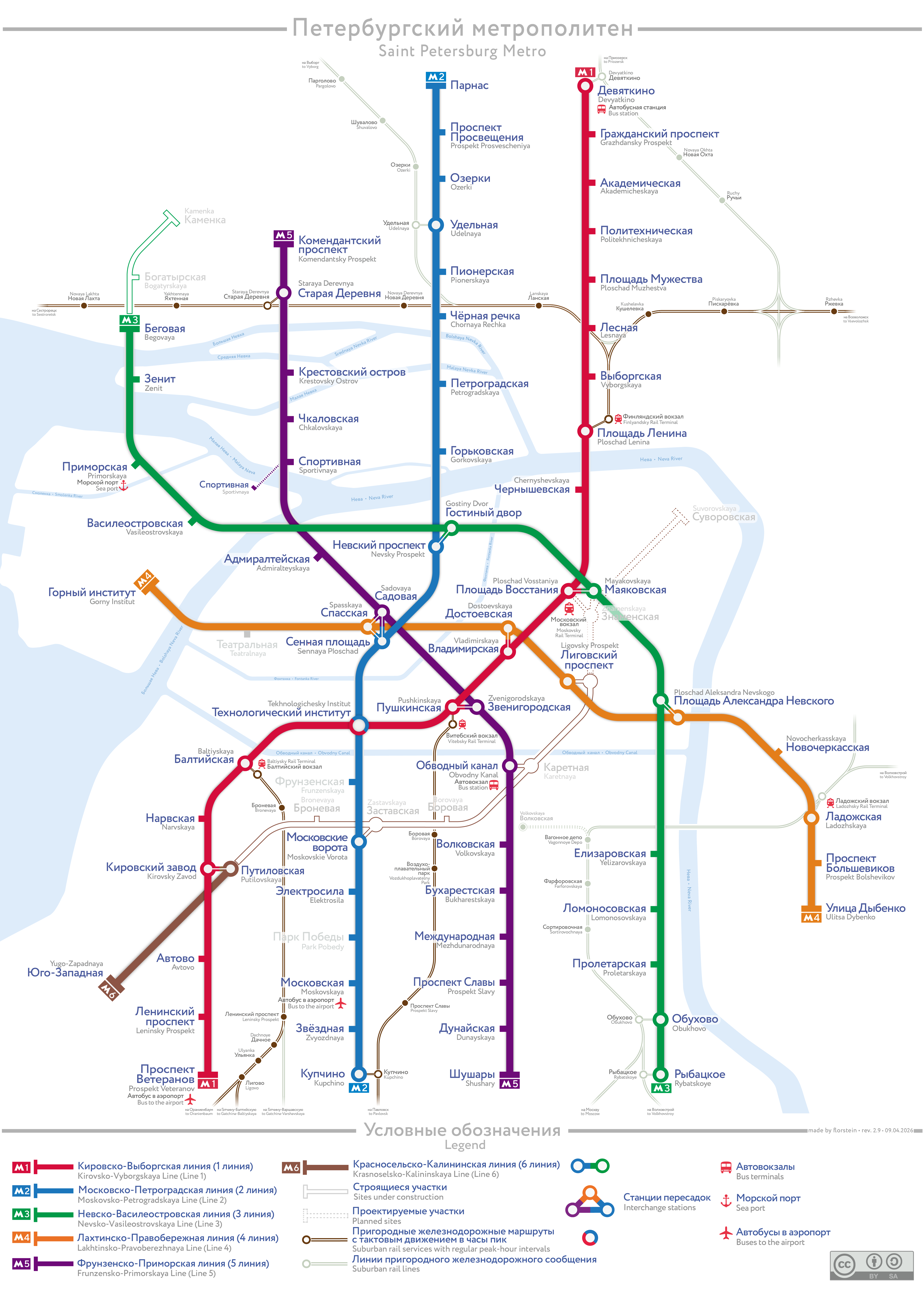

The Saint Petersburg Metro (Russian: Петербургский метрополитен, romanised: Peterburgskiy metropoliten) is a rapid transit system in Saint Petersburg, Russia. Construction began in early 1941 and the system opened on 15 November 1955 after delays due to World War II and the Siege of Leningrad, during which the constructed stations were used as bomb shelters.

Formerly known as the Order of Lenin Leningrad Metro named after V. I. Lenin (Ленинградский Ордена Ленина Метрополитен имени В. И. Ленина), the system includes many examples of Stalinist architecture, including exquisite decorations and artwork. Due to the city's unique geology, including soft topsoil and underground rivers and high-pressure aquifers, as well as its possible use as bomb shelters, it is also one of the deepest metro systems in the world and the deepest by the average depth of all the stations. The deepest station, Admiralteyskaya, is 86 metres (282 ft) below ground.

The network consists of 6 lines with a total length of 131 kilometres (81 mi). It has 75 stations including 8 transfer points. It is one of the busiest metro systems in Europe, with annual ridership of 686 million passengers (almost 2 million/day).

Fares per trip are ₽65 if paid via Podorozhnik card or ₽95 if paid by bank card or token. Discounts are given if transferring from another form of public transport.

== History ==
=== 1820-1917: Early planning ===
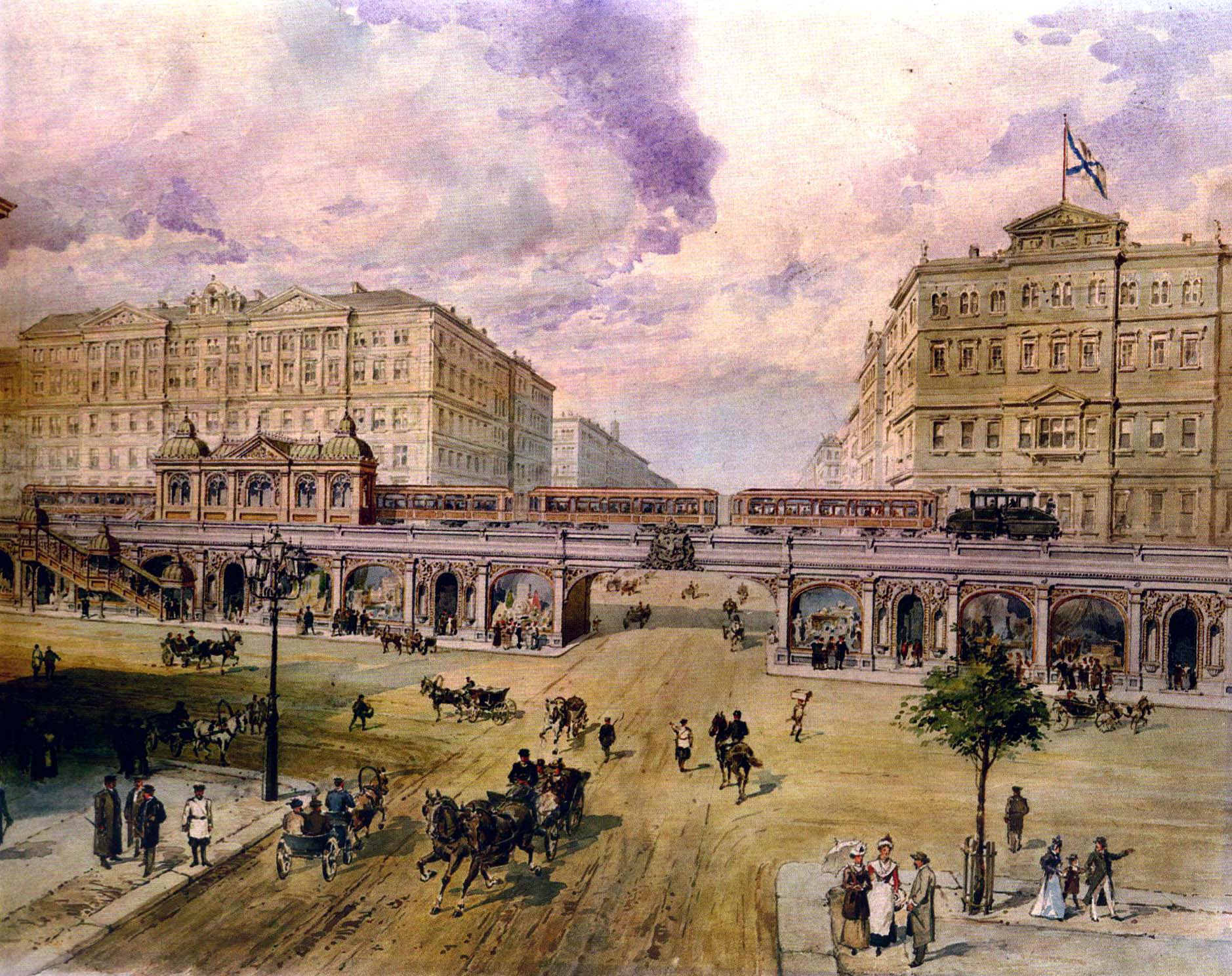
Balinsky's project for an elevated metro in Saint Petersburg (early 1900s).

In 1820, Torgovanov, a resident of the city, submitted a plan to Tsar Alexander I — involving the digging of a tunnel from the centre of the city to Vasilyevsky Island. The Russian ruler rejected the project and ordered the inventor to sign a pledge "not to engage in hare-brained schemes in the future, but to exercise his efforts in matters appropriate to his estate." Other, more developed projects subsequently emerged, but they, too, received no recognition.

Many people said that the excavation works would "violate the amenities and respectability of the city"; the landlords affirmed that underground traffic would undermine the foundations of the buildings; the merchants feared that "the open excavations would interfere with normal trade"; and the clergy insisted that "the underground passages running near church buildings would detract from their dignity." Therefore, the project was not advanced.

By the end of the 19th century, certain interested parties began discussing the possibility of opening the Russian Empire's first metropolitan railway system. The press praised the initial plans, while engineers privately worried about the serious lack of experience in the sort of projects required to build a metro; at the time, Saint Petersburg did not even have electrified tramways. However, due to the wish of the municipal authorities of the time to take ownership of the metro after its eventual entry into service, none of the aforementioned projects ever came to fruition.

In 1901, engineer Vladimir Pechkovsky presented a project to build an elevated station in the middle of Nevsky Prospect, opposite the Kazan Cathedral, and to link it, via elevated and underground sections of track (above the Ekaterinsky and Obvodny canals and beneath the Zabalkansky prospect) with the Baltiysky and Varshavsky Rail Terminals. In the same year, Reshevsky, also an engineer, working at the behest of the Emperor's minister for transport, came up with two possible projects, which aimed primarily to unite all of Saint Petersburg's main railway stations with one urban interchange. An interesting development, the work upon which had been carried out for many years by railway engineer P.I. Balinsky (one of the first Russian metro engineers) involved plans to build a dedicated network of six urban lines, two of which would be radial lines with a total length of 172 kilometres (107 mi). The construction work (including the filling of low-lying areas of the city in order to avoid flooding, construction of 11 major bridges, embankments and viaducts at a height of 5–10 metres (16–33 ft), and the actual laying of track etc.) was projected to cost around 190 million rubles. However, in 1903 Emperor Nicholas II rejected the scheme before any work ever started.

Almost all pre-revolutionary designs featured the concept of an elevated metro system, similar to the Paris Metro or Vienna Stadtbahn. However, as it was later discovered through the experience of operating uncovered ground-level metro sections in St. Petersburg (which were later closed due to the same reason), such projects had many maintenance issues. Russian engineers had neither sufficient equipment nor technical skills at the time to build deep-lying tunnels through the challenging ground beneath St. Petersburg. In 1918, Moscow became the country's capital after the October Revolution of 1917 and the Russian Civil War (1917–1922) followed; for more than a decade plans to build a metro in Petrograd languished.

=== 1938-1945: First phase construction and World War II ===
In 1938, the question of building a metro for St Petersburg (by then renamed to Leningrad), resurfaced at the initiative of Alexei Kosygin, Chairman of the Executive Committee of the Leningrad City Soviets of Working People's Deputies. Ivan Zubkov, an engineer who for his work was later to become a Hero of Socialist Labour, was appointed the first director for the metro construction. The project was designed by the Moscow institute 'Metrogiprotrans', but on 21 January 1941 'Construction Directorate № 5 of the People's Commissariat' was founded as a body to specifically oversee the design and construction of the Leningrad Metro. By April 1941, 34 shafts for the initial phase of construction had been finished.

During World War II, construction work was halted due to severe lack of funding, manpower and equipment. At this time, many of the metro construction workers were employed in the construction and repair of railheads during the Siege of Leningrad. Zubkov died in 1944.

=== 1946-1955: Construction completion and opening ===
In 1946, under the leadership of M A Samodurov, Lenmetroproyekt was created to finish the construction of the first phase of the metro. A new version of the metro project, devised by specialists, identified two solutions to construction problems. Firstly, stations were to be built at a level slightly raised above that of normal track so as to prevent drainage directly into them, whilst the average tunnel width was reduced from the 6 metres (19 ft 8 in) standard of the Moscow Metro to 5.5 metres (18 ft 1 in).

On 3 September 1947, construction began again in the Leningrad subway, and in December 1954, the Council of Ministers of the USSR ordered the establishment of the state transport organisation Leningradsky Metropoliten, to be headed by Ivan Novikov. The organisation set up its offices in the building directly above Tekhnologichesky Institut station. On 7 October 1955, the electricity was turned on in the metro, and on 5 November 1955, the act by which the first stage of the metro was put into operation, was signed.

The grand opening was held on 15 November 1955, with seven stations on Line 1. The eighth station, Pushkinskaya opened a few months later. These stations connected the Moscow Rail Terminal in the city centre with the Kirovsky industrial zone in the southwest. In 1978, the line was extended past the city limits into the Leningrad Oblast. participants of the construction of the metro first stage received a total of 1,023 governmental awards.

=== 1958-1991: Construction of additional lines ===
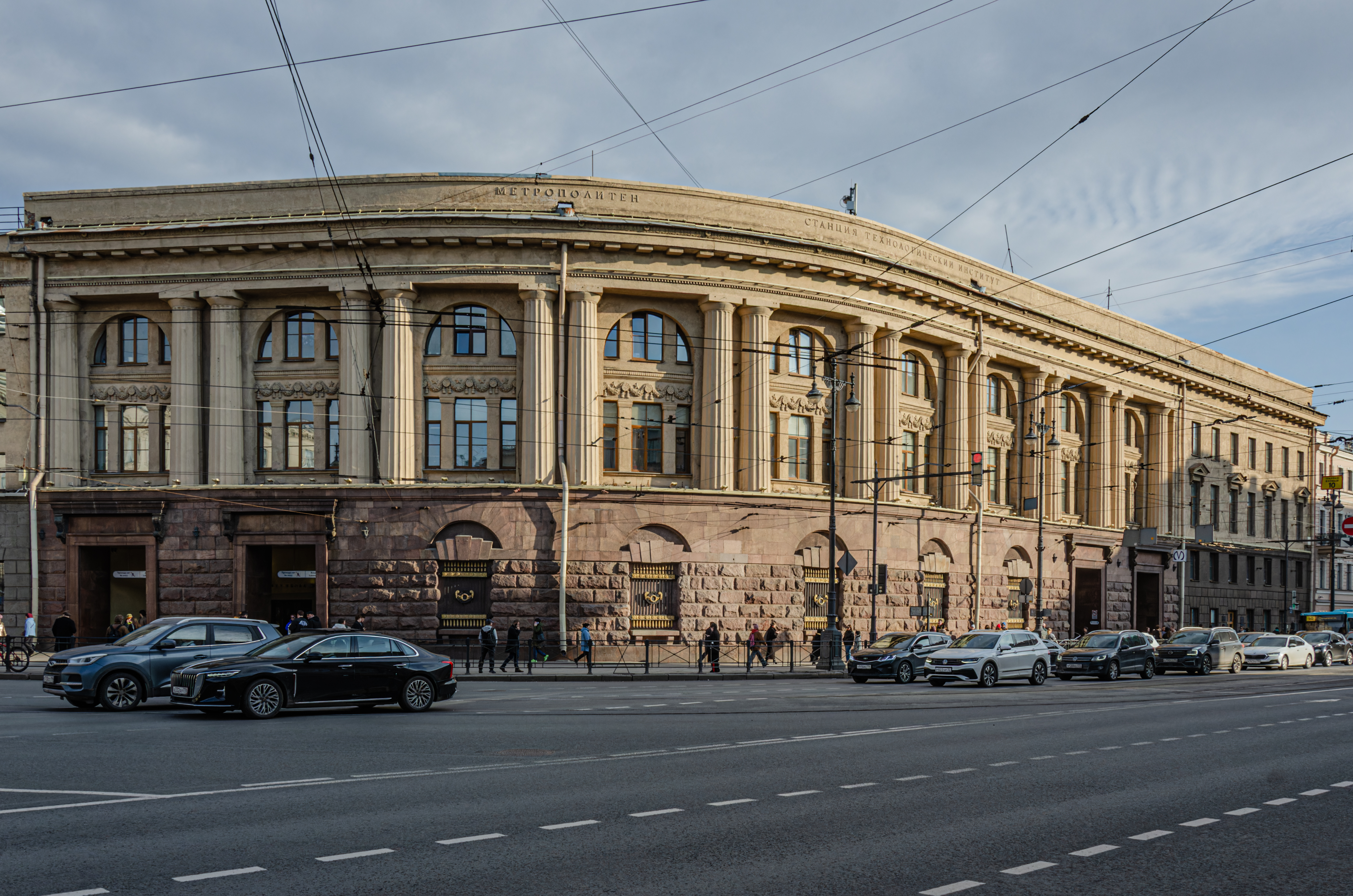
The metro's main administrative office.

In 1958, Line 1 was extended beneath the Neva river to the Finlyandsky Rail Terminal. This same line was extended in the 1970s, when the Vyborgsky radius brought the metro to new residential areas constructed in the north-east of the city, and by 1978, those further out, in the nearby Leningrad Oblast. This metro line was expanded to the south-west, with the construction of the Kirovsky radius, in 1977. While constructing Line 1 in the 1970s, the tunnelers entered an underground cavity of the Neva River. They managed to complete the tunnel, but in 1995, the tunnel had to be closed and a section of it between Lesnaya and Ploschad Muzhestva flooded. For more than nine years, the northern segment of the line was physically cut off from the rest of the system. A new set of tunnels was built and, in June 2004, normal service was restored.

Construction of Line 2 began almost immediately after the initial opening of the metro. In 1961, the section from Tekhnologichesky Institut to Park Pobedy, along Moskovsky Prospect to the southern areas of the city, was opened. In 1963, the line was extended north to the station Petrogradskaya station; in the process making Tekhnologichesky Institut the USSR's first cross-platform interchange station. Further extension of the line was undertaken to the south in the early 1970s. In the 1980s, it was extended to the north; the final station, Parnas, opened in 2006.

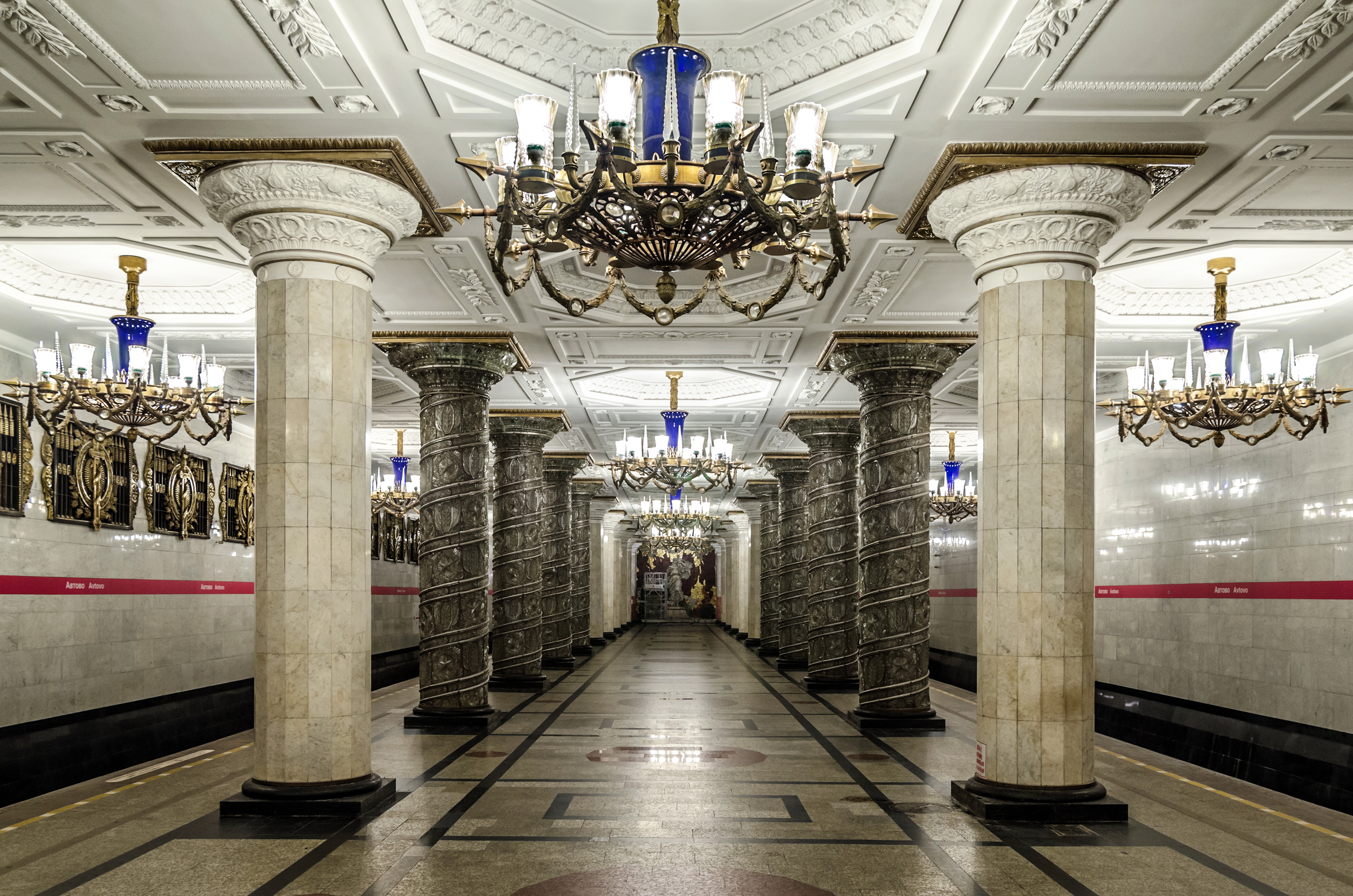
Avtovo station is widely considered to be one of the most exquisitely decorated metro stations in the world.

Line 3 opened in 1967 and eventually linked Vasilievsky Island, the city centre, and the industrial zones on the southeastern bank of the Neva in a series of extensions in 1970, 1979, 1981, and 1984.

Line 4 was opened in 1985 to serve the new residential districts on the right bank of the Neva before reaching the city centre in 1991 and continuing to the northwest in the late 1990s. In March 2009, Line 4 was expanded with the addition of Spasskaya station.

Line 5 opened in 2008 with the Volkovskaya and Zvenigorodskaya stations. It was expanded to the Primorsky and Frunzensky districts.

=== 1991: Dissolution of Soviet Union and network expansion ===
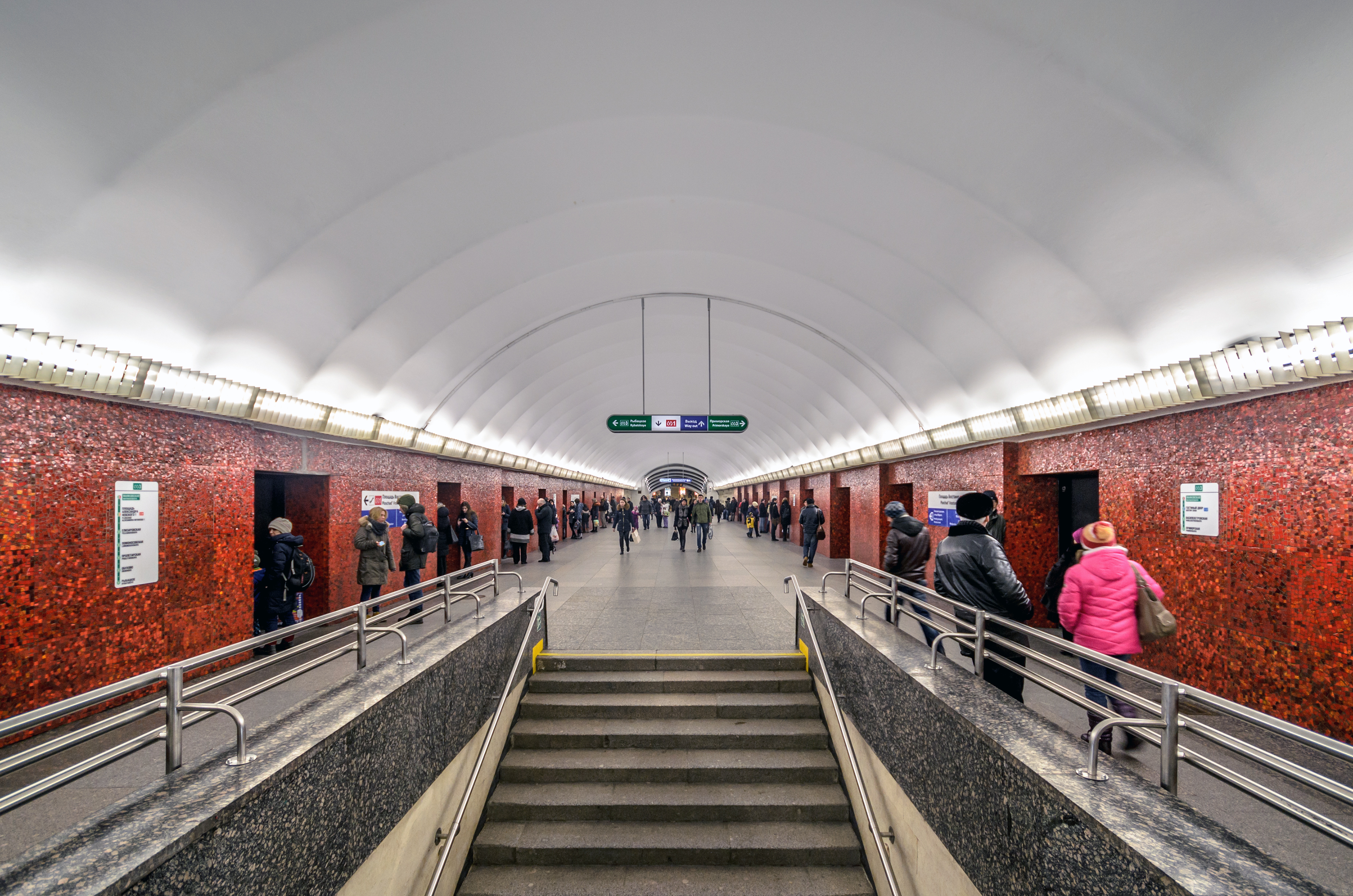
Mayakovskaya station is of the horizontal lift design, a type of platform screen doors unique to the Saint Petersburg Metro.

At the time of the dissolution of the Soviet Union in 1991, the Metro comprised 54 stations and 94.2 kilometres (58.5 mi) of track. In early 1992, construction of 14 stations began. These included six stations of the Primorsky radius (Admiralteyskaya, Sportivnaya, Chkalovskaya, Krestovsky Ostrov, Staraya Derevnya, and Komendantsky Prospekt), two stations on the fourth line (Spasskaya and transfer tunnels to Sadovaya station), Parnas and the 'Vyborg' depot on line 2, and five stations of the Frunzensky radius (Zvenigorodskaya, Obvodny Kanal, Volkovskaya, Bukharestskaya, and Mezhdunarodnaya). The stations opened in the early 2000s.

=== 2017: Terrorist bombing ===
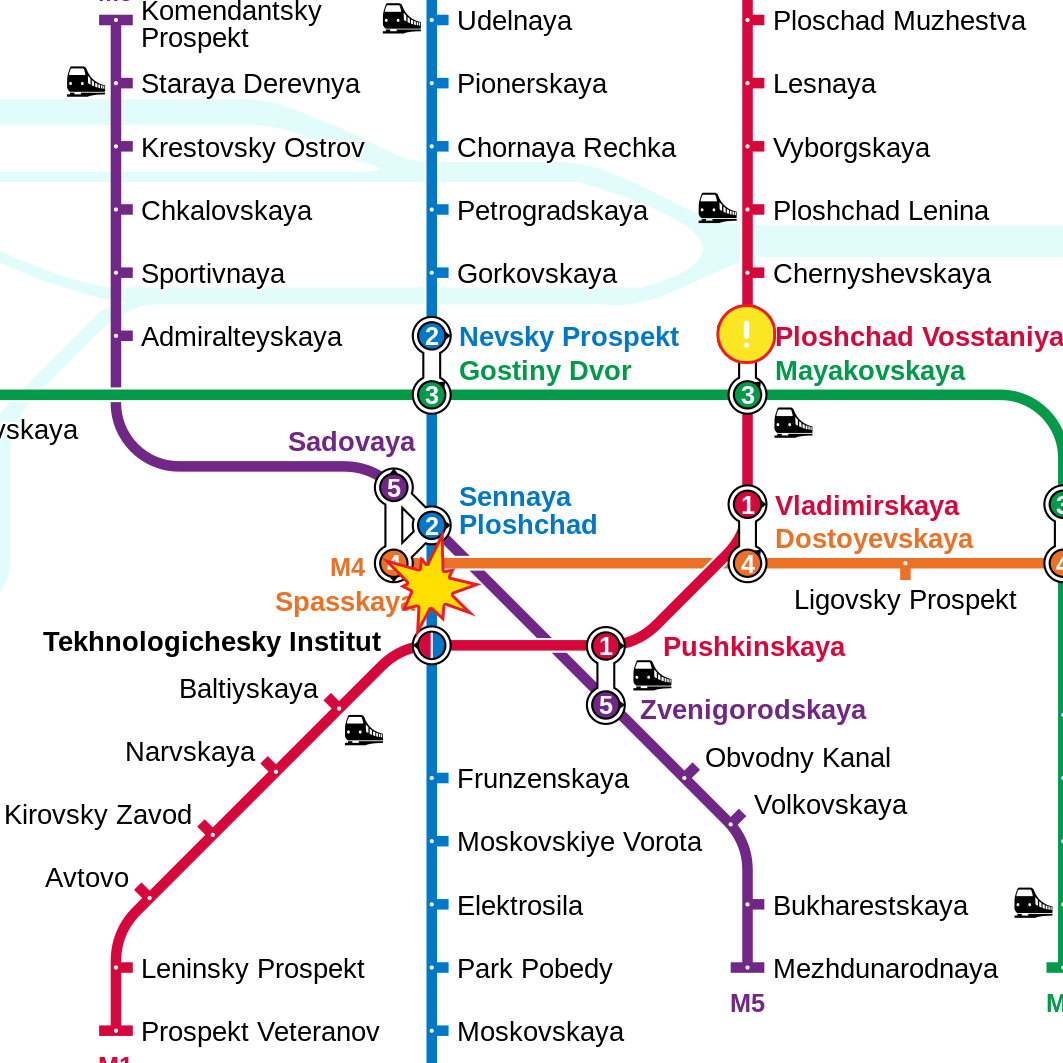
Location of the two stations and the tunnel in the Saint Petersburg Metro where the explosion occurred

On 3 April 2017 at 2:20 pm local time, approximately 14 people died and over 50 sustained injuries from an explosion on a train in a tunnel between Sennaya Ploshchad and Tekhnologicheski Institut stations, on the Line 2. A second improvised explosive device was found and defused at Ploshchad Vosstaniya metro station, on Line 1. President of Russia Vladimir Putin was in Saint Petersburg when the blast occurred and issued condolence statements to the victims' families. The perpetrator was a Russian citizen who was an ethnic Uzbek born in Kyrgyzstan. The motive was Islamic terrorism in Europe.

=== 2025: Opening of Line 6 ===
Line 6 opened in 2025 with 2 stations, Yugo-Zapadnaya and Putilovskaya. Additional stations are planned to open in 2029 and 2030.

=== Future expansion ===
A metro map showing the planned stations is available online.

In 2029, the Bogatyrskaya and Kamenka stations, as well as Teatralnaya, are expected to open. In 2030, Bronevaya, Zastavskaya, Borovaya, Karetnaya and Ligovsky Prospekt-2 are expected to open. Six more stations are planned to open in 2035, and three more in 2036. A circle line is also planned.

== Lines ==
#	Full name	Opened	Most recent station opened	Length (km)	Number of stations	Cars per train	Avg. distance between stations (km)	Average speed with stops (km/h)	Ride time (min) (Approximately and depends on time of day)	Avg. station depth (m)
Line 1 (Saint Petersburg Metro)	Kirovsko-Vyborgskaya	15 Nov 1955	29 Dec 1978	29.7	19	8	1.6	39	48	50
Line 2 (Saint Petersburg Metro)	Moskovsko-Petrogradskaya	29 Apr 1961	22 Dec 2006	30.1	18	6	1.8	39	48	45
Line 3 (Saint Petersburg Metro)	Nevsko-Vasileostrovskaya	3 Nov 1967	26 May 2018	27.6	12	6	2.5	42	40	50
Line 4 (Saint Petersburg Metro)	Lakhtinsko-Pravoberezhnaya	30 Dec 1985	27 Dec 2024	14.8	9	7	1.9	42	26	62
Line 5 (Saint Petersburg Metro)	Frunzensko-Primorskaya	20 Dec 2008	3 Oct 2019	26.2	15	8	1.9	43	39	57
Line 6 (Saint Petersburg Metro)	Krasnoselsko-Kalininskaya	26 Dec 2025	26 Dec 2025	2.6	2	8	2.6		4	57
Total:				131	75					
Average:				21.8			2.0	41	34	53

=== Line 1 (Kirovsko-Vyborgskaya) ===
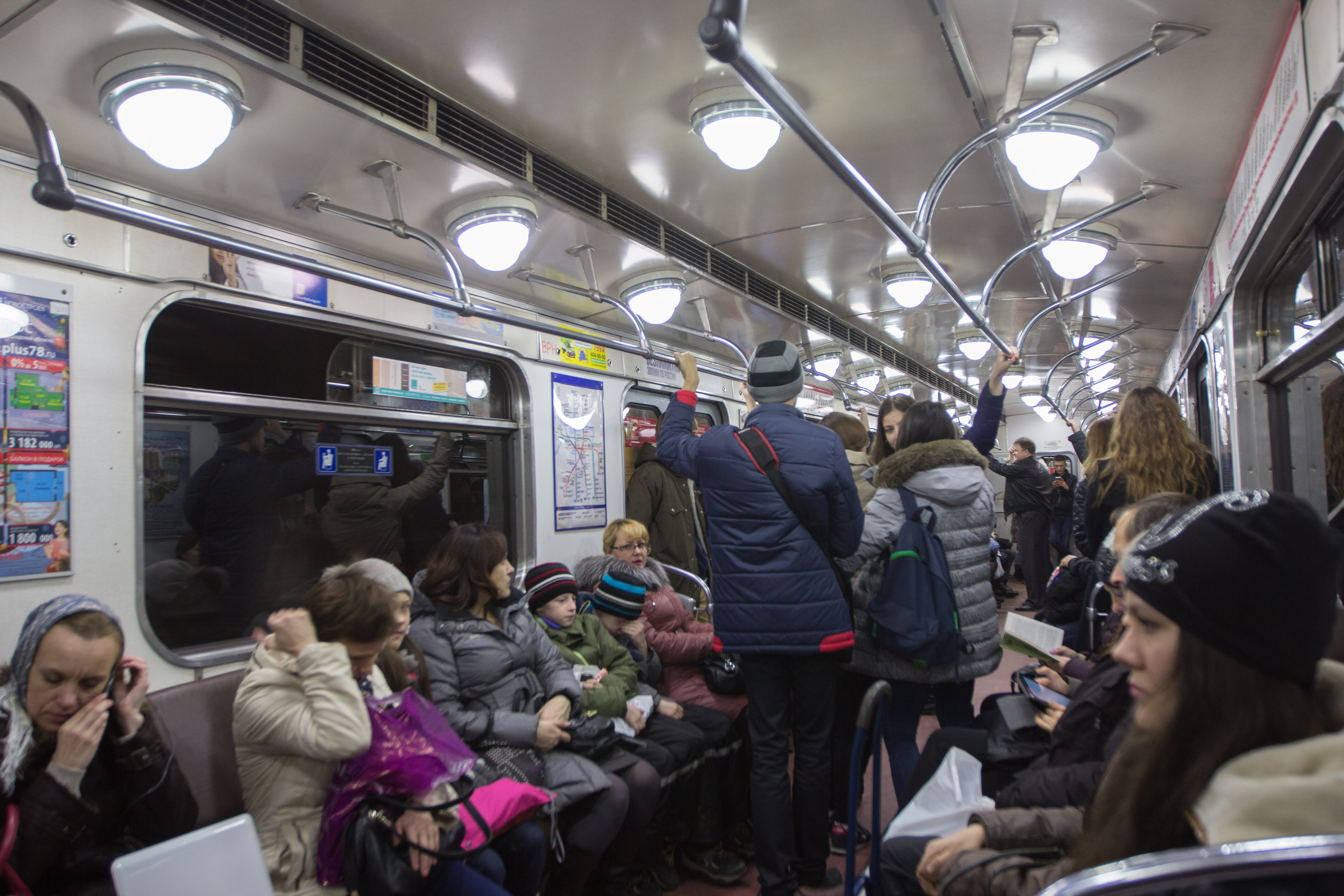
Line 1 train interior

Line 1 is the oldest line of the metro, opened in 1955. The original stations are elaborately decorated, especially Avtovo and Narvskaya. The line connects four out of five Saint Petersburg's main railway stations. In 1995, a flooding occurred in a tunnel between Lesnaya and Ploschad Muzhestva stations and, for nine years, the line was separated into two independent segments (the gap was connected by a shuttle bus route). The line contains three of the six shallow stations that are present in the metro.

The line cuts Saint Petersburg centre on a northeast–southwest axis. In the south, its alignment follows the shore of the Gulf of Finland. In the north, it extends outside the city limits into the Leningrad oblast (it is the only line to stretch beyond the city boundary). Line 1 is generally coloured red on Metro maps.

=== Line 2 (Moskovsko-Petrogradskaya) ===
Line 2 is the second oldest line of the metro, opened in 1961. It featured the first cross-platform transfer in the USSR. It was also the first metro line in Saint Petersburg to feature a unique platform type that soon became dubbed as "Horizontal Lift."

The line cuts Saint Petersburg on a north-south axis and is generally coloured blue on Metro maps. In 2006, as an extension was opened, it became the longest line on the system.

=== Line 3 (Nevsko-Vasileostrovskaya) ===
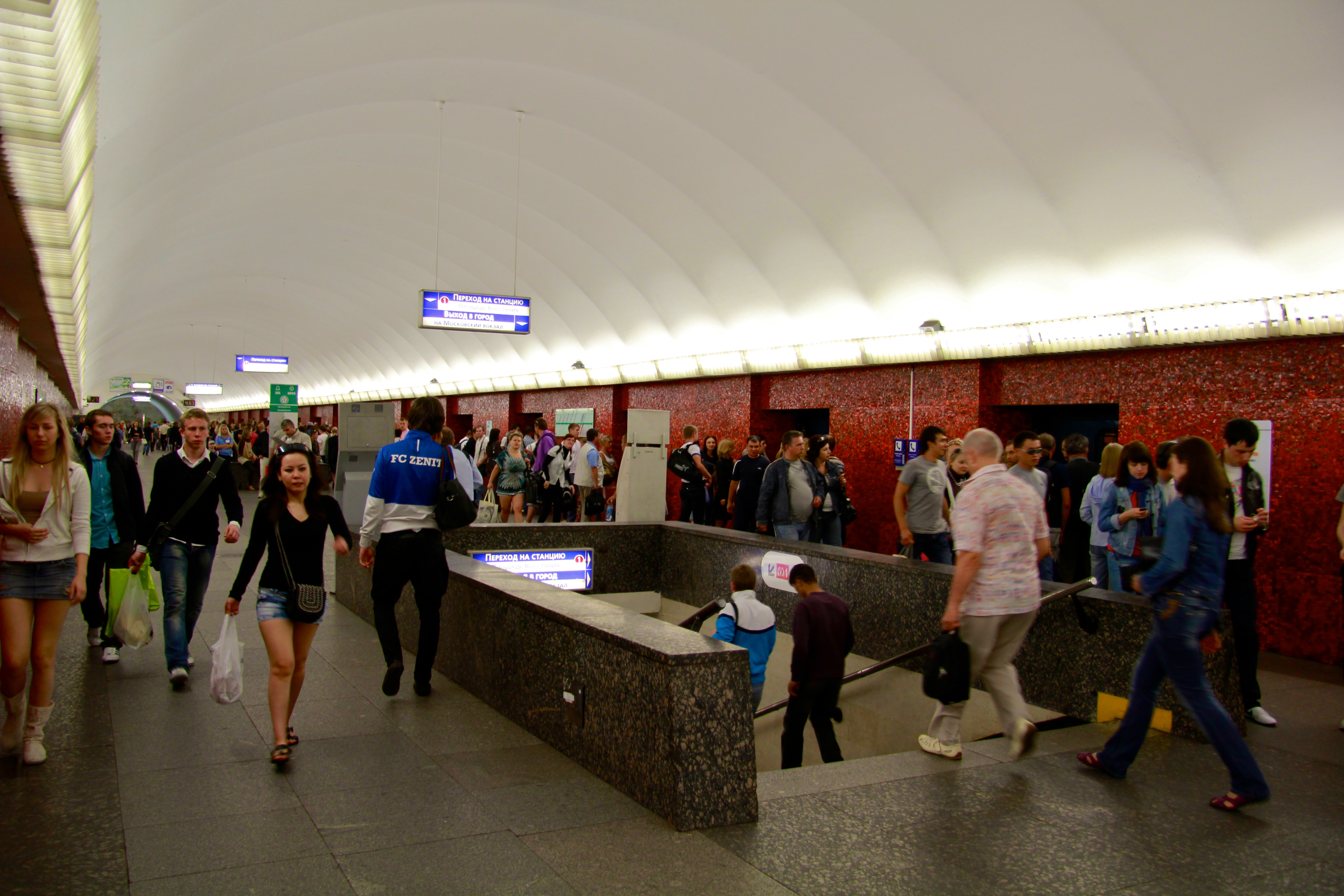
Mayakovskaya station

Line 3 opened in 1967. Its stations are almost exclusively of "Horizontal Lift" type and it has the longest inter-station tunnels in the entire system. Metro officials originally intended to add stations in-between the existing ones, but those plans were abandoned.

The line cuts Saint Petersburg centre on an east-west axis and then turns southeast following the left bank of the Neva River. It is generally coloured green on Metro maps.

In 2018, 2 new stations, Zenit and Begovaya, were opened.

=== Line 4 (Lakhtinsko-Pravoberezhnaya) ===
Line 4 opened in 1985.

The line originally opened to provide access from the centre for the new residential areas in the eastern part of city, along the right bank of the Neva River. However, delays in the construction of the future Line 5 compelled to temporarily link the already completed northern part of the Line 5 (starting from Sadovaya) to Pravoberezhnaya Line, as they felt that it was better to have a single connected line rather than two unconnected ones. From that point on, the line expanded northward, as per original plans of Line 5 expansion.

In March 2009, Spasskaya was completed, creating the city's first three-way transfer and it officially became the new terminal for Line 4. As per the original plan, all Line 4 stations north of Dostoyevskaya were absorbed into Line 5. In December 2024, Gorny Institut opened and construction began on Teatralnaya.

=== Line 5 (Frunzensko-Primorskaya) ===
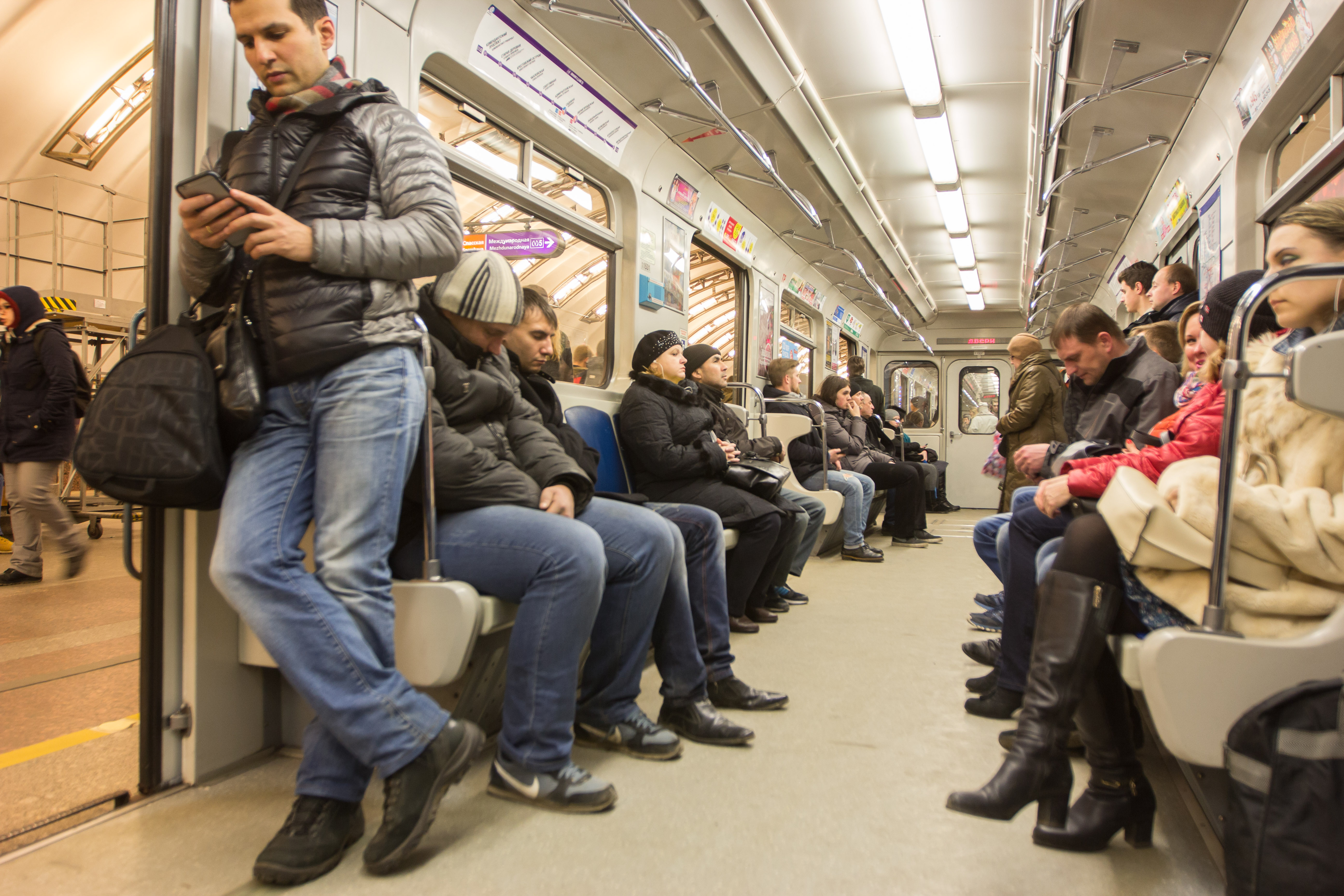
Train on the Sadovaya station

Line 5 connects the city's historical centre to the northwestern and southern districts. The line is planned to be expanded to the north.

The line opened in December 2008. It contained only two stations until March 2009, when the Line 4 segment between Komendantsky Prospekt and Sadovaya stations became a part of the new line.

Line 4 was split in early 2009, and the new Line 5 took the northern (Primorsky) radius away from Pravoberezhnaya and opened with a new section (Frunzensky) to the south.

Bukharestskaya and Mezhdunarodnaya opened in December 2012. In 2019, Prospekt Slavy, Dunayskaya, and Shushary opened.

=== Line 6 (Krasnosel'sko-Kalininskaya) ===
Line 6 includes two stations, Yugo-Zapadnaya and Putilovskaya, which opened in December 2025. The line will be expanded from the southwest of Saint Petersburg, through the city centre, to the northeast of the city. Additional stations are planned to open in 2029 and 2030.

== Station construction styles and architecture ==
Time evolution of the number of stations.

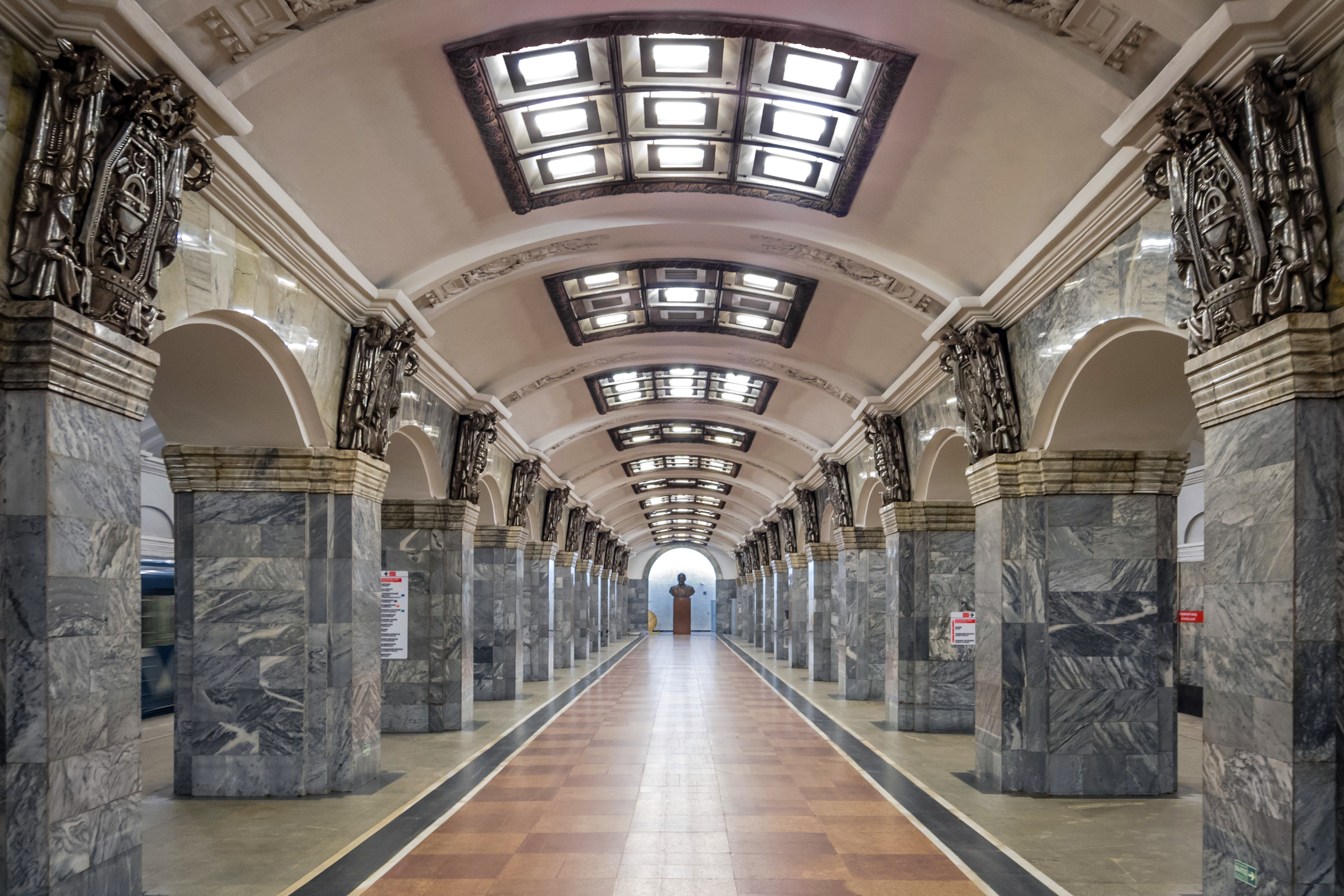
Kirovsky Zavod station.

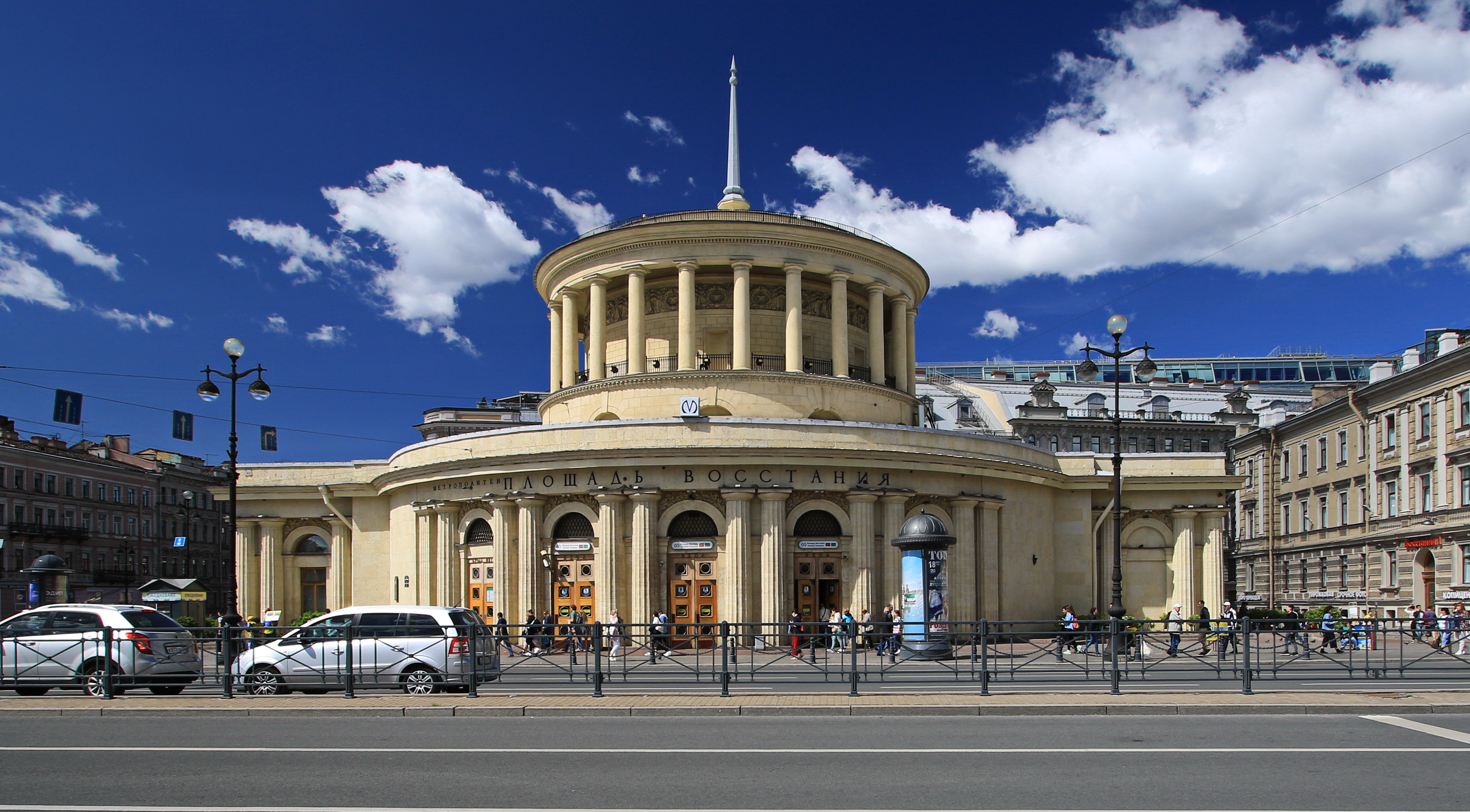
Most stations have large surface vestibules, such as Ploshchad Vosstaniya ("Uprising Square")

Stations in the centre of the city were built very deep, not only to minimise disruption, but to be used as bomb shelters during the Cold War. Many of the older stations feature blast doors and air filters.

Stations are enclosed due to the harsh winters.

The older stations are decorated in the Stalinist Architecture style, but from 1958, Nikita Khrushchev's struggle with decorative extras restricted the vivid decorations to simple aesthetic themes.

The original stations were predominantly pylon stations, of which there are 15 stations. Also common are deep column stations, and there are 16 such stations in the system.

The "horizontal lift" layout was used on 10 stations. The horizontal lift design is a variation of a station with platform screen doors, and has not been found elsewhere outside Saint Petersburg. However, because the design became unpopular with passengers, and for technical reasons, no stations featuring this design were built between 1972 and 2018. From the mid-1970s, a new open design called Leningradky Odnosvod (single-vault station) was developed by local engineers and became very popular, not only in Saint Petersburg, but other cities as well. It remains the most popular and there are 16 stations with this design in the city.

The remaining stations are far away from the underground geology that forms the Neva Delta. The six shallow column stations are in the southern and northwestern sections of the city, and the first three are on the Kirovsko-Vyborgskaya Line. The first one, Avtovo, is considered to be one of the most beautiful stations in the world and was opened as part of the first stage in 1955, while the other two were built in the late 1970s as typical Moscow-style pillar trispan stations. There are two shallow-column stations on the Nevsko-Vasileostrovskaya Line: Zenit and Begovaya. Both of these stations, which use a modified version of the horizontal lift design, were opened in May 2018 as part of the line's extension to the northwestern section of the city. A sixth shallow-column station, Dunayskaya, opened in October 2019 as part of the Frunzensko-Primorskaya Line's southern extension. In addition, there are four termini stations that are on the surface and are located near the lines' connection with the train depots.

== Operation ==
The Metro is managed by the state municipal company Sankt-Peterburgsky Metropoliten (Saint Petersburg Metropolitan, Russian: Санкт-Петербургский Метрополитен) that was privatised from the Ministry of Rail Services. The Metro was renamed to coincide with the city's name change in the early 1990s. The company employs several thousand men and women in station and track management as well as rolling stock operation and maintenance.

The Metro is financed by the city of Saint Petersburg, from passenger fares, and from selling advertising at the stations and on the trains. Metro construction is undertaken by the subsidiary Lenmetrostroy (Russian: Ленметрострой) that is financed by the Metro as well as directly by the Ministry of Transportation.

=== Rolling stock ===
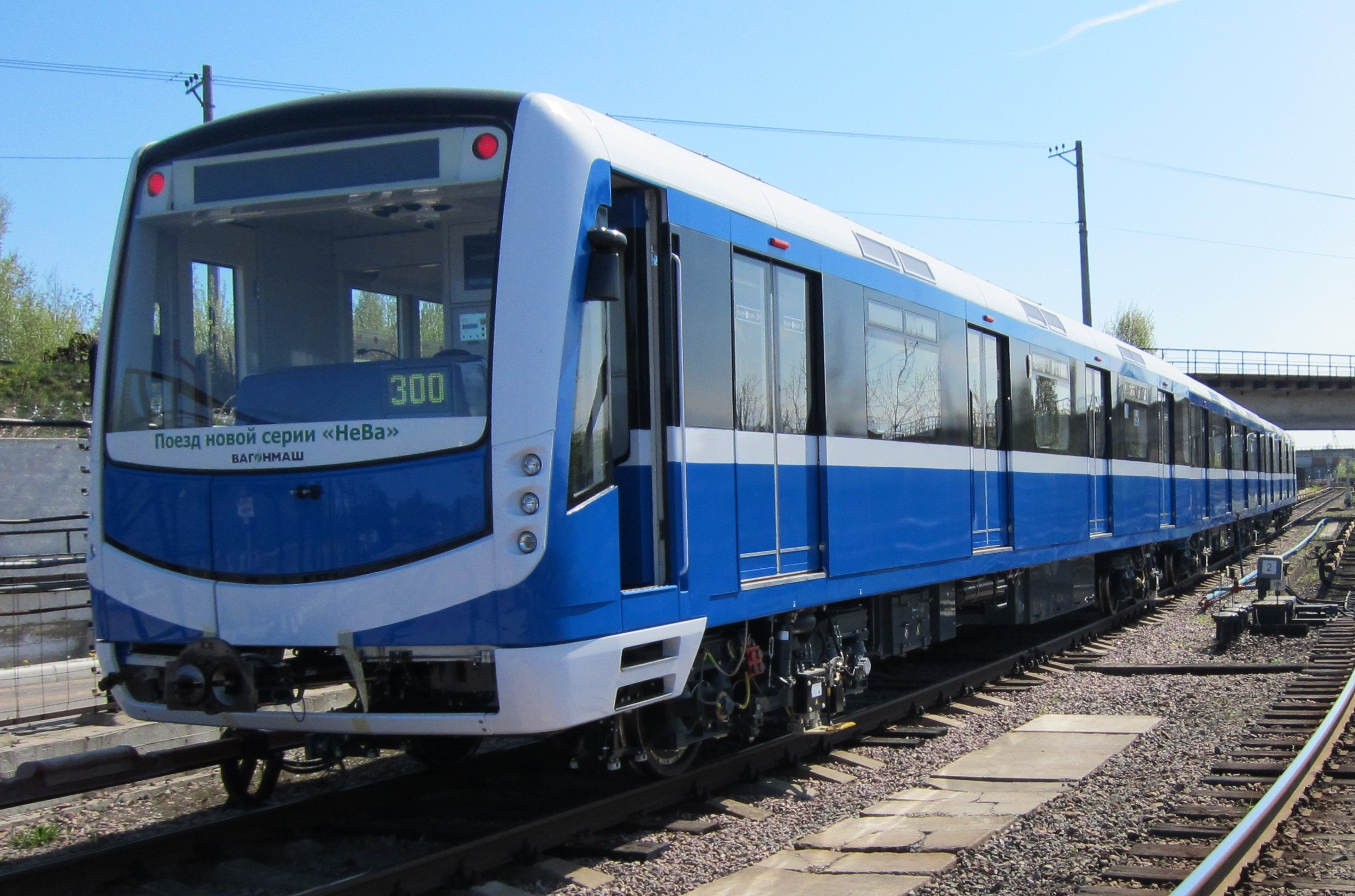
'Neva' class rolling stock (built by Vagonmash) for the Saint Petersburg metro.

The rolling stock of the metro is provided by five depots with a total of 1403 cars forming 188 trains. Most of the models are the Metrowagonmash 81-717/714 that are very common in all ex-Soviet cities. In addition there are older E and Em type trains on the Kirovsko-Vyborgskaya Line and newer 81-540/541 (built by Škoda Transportation unit Vagonmash) on the Pravoberezhnaya and Fruzenskaya-Primorskaya Line. In addition, the Metro has also received 81-722 and 81-724 cars from Metrowagonmash, which are custom models specifically for Saint Petersburg. Both these and the Skoda cars are equipped with sliding doors that go in to pockets rather than the plug doors now being used elsewhere. This is due to the fact that several stations on the system have platform doors that do not permit sufficient clearance for the plug ones. Transmashholding unveiled a new prototype train for the St Petersburg Metro in June 2019. In August 2022, an order was placed for 950 cars, the first was delivered in September 2022.

=== Security ===
The Metro was built as a system that could offer shelter in case of nuclear warfare. Every station is equipped with closed-circuit television surveillance following terrorist threats.

Until the summer of 2009, all photography and video filming in the Metro required a permit. However, because of a legal challenge by an amateur photographer, photography without a flash is now permitted without a permit.

== See also ==
- List of metro systems
- Buses in Saint Petersburg
- Trams in Saint Petersburg
- Saint Petersburg trolleybus system
