= Prospekt Slavy (Saint Petersburg Metro) =

Saint Petersburg Metro Station

Coordinates: 59°51′24″N 30°23′43″E

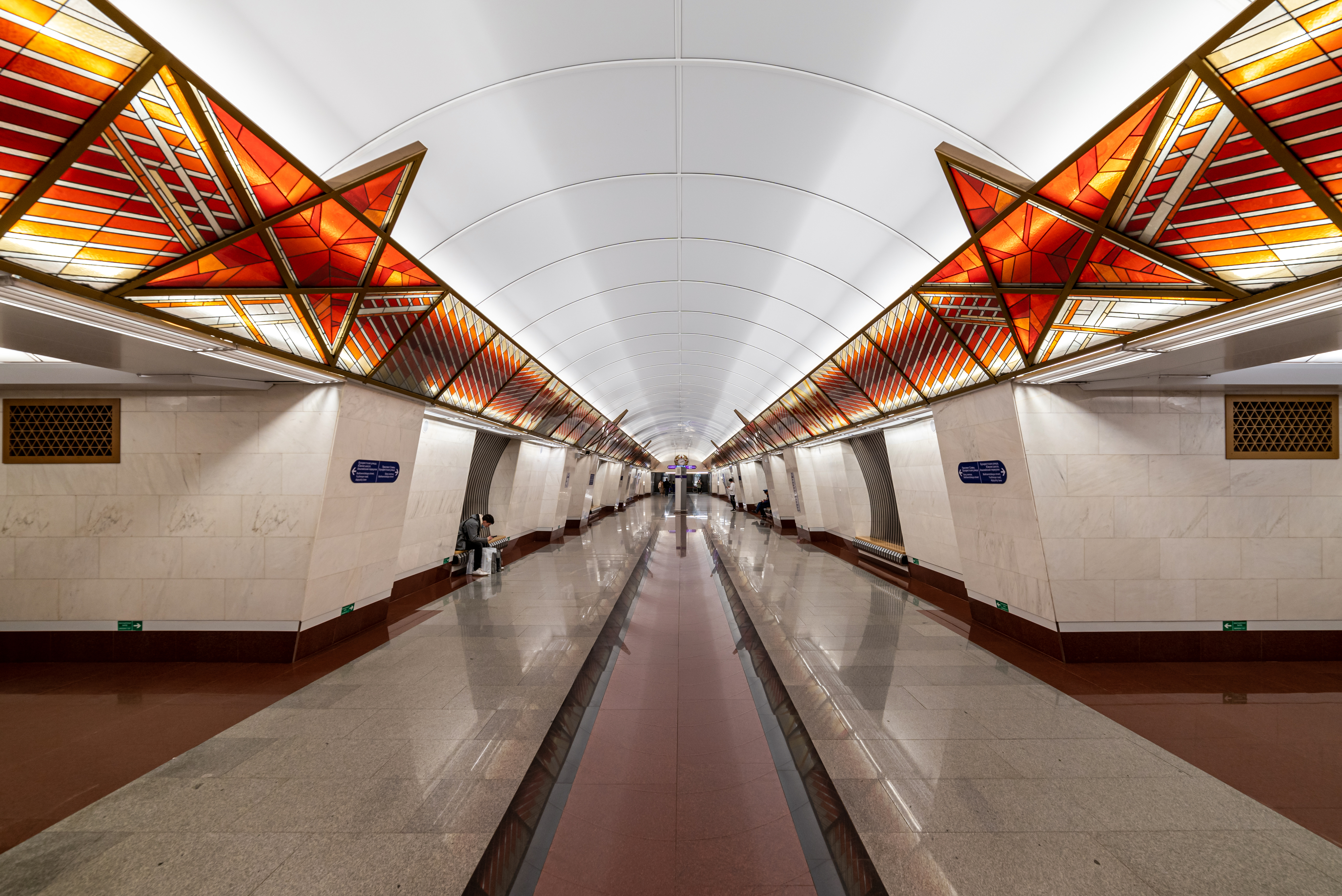

General information
- System: Saint Petersburg Metro station
- Operator: Saint Petersburg Metro
- Line: Frunzensko–Primorskaya Line
- Platforms: 1 (Island platform)
- Tracks: 2

Construction
- Structure type: Underground

History
- Opened: 3 October 2019
- Electrified: Third rail

Services
Preceding station	Saint Petersburg Metro	Following station
Mezhdunarodnaya towards Komendantsky Prospekt	Line 5	Dunayskaya towards Shushary
Location

Prospekt Slavy (Russian: Проспект Славы (Avenue of Glory) is a Saint Petersburg Metro station on the Frunzensko–Primorskaya Line (Line 5) of the Saint Petersburg Metro. It was opened on 3 October 2019 as a part of the extension of the line to the south from Mezhdunarodnaya. The extension also included Dunayskaya and Shushary stations. Prospect Slavy is located between Mezhdunarodnaya and Dunayskaya.

Prospekt Slavy is built under the corner of Bukharestskaya Street and Slavy Avenue, in Frunzensky District.

== Architecture and decoration of the station ==
Despite its depth, the station has 2 exits equipped with four escalators each, the station structure itself is three-spanned, with arches between the central hall and the platforms. The entrance lobbies are underground, equipped with escalators, and also serve as underground passages under Bucharest Street.The station is decorated in the theme of the Great Patriotic War and the Afghan War. In the southern lobby of the station there is an exhibition of fire fighting equipment from tsarist Russia and the Soviet Union, represented by the ZiL-130 fire truck.

== Transfers to other public transport ==
Buses: 11, 54, 56, 57, 114, 116, 141, 157, 239, 241, 253, 282, 288. Trolleybuses: 26, 27, 29. Trams: 25, 43, 45, 49.
