= Mezhdunarodnaya (Saint Petersburg Metro) =

Saint Petersburg Metro Station

Coordinates: 59°52′12″N 30°22′47″E

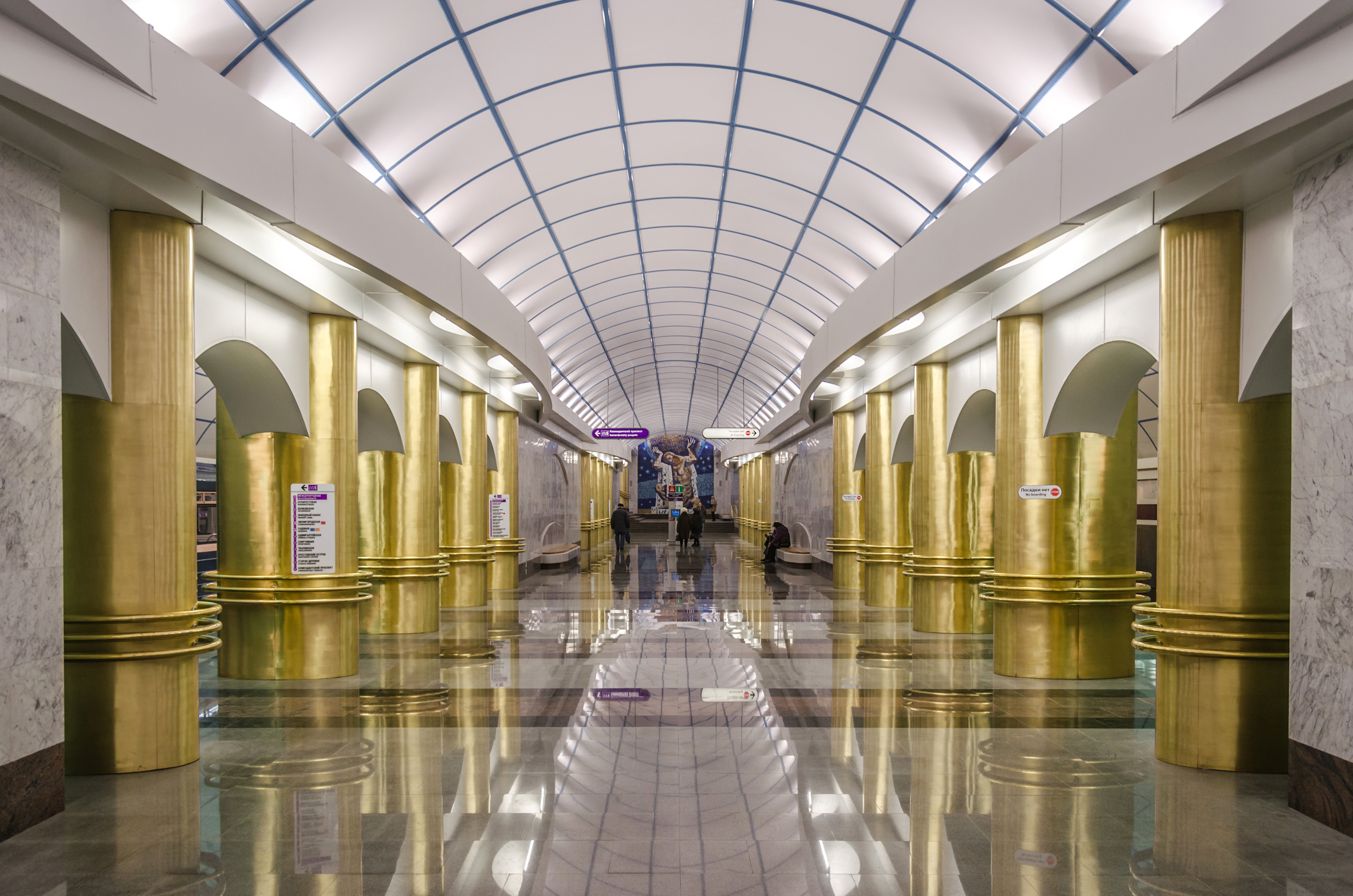
- Station hall

General information
- Location: 3, Bely Kuna Street, Frunzensky District; Saint Petersburg; Russia
- System: Saint Petersburg Metro station
- Operator: Saint Petersburg Metro
- Line: Frunzensko–Primorskaya Line
- Platforms: 1 (Island platform)
- Tracks: 2

Construction
- Structure type: Underground
- Depth: 65 metres (213 ft)
- Parking: No
- Cycle facilities: Yes

History
- Opened: 28 December 2012
- Electrified: 825 V DC low third rail

Services
Preceding station	Saint Petersburg Metro	Following station
Bukharestskaya towards Komendantsky Prospekt	Line 5	Prospekt Slavy towards Shushary
Route map
Location

Mezhdunarodnaya (Russian: Международная) (literally - international) is a Saint Petersburg Metro station on the Frunzensko-Primorskaya Line (Line 5) of the Saint Petersburg Metro. It was opened on December 28, 2012 together with Bukharestskaya as an extension of the Frunzensko-Primorskaya Line. It was the southeastern terminus of the line until 3 October 2019, when an extension of the line to the south with three stations, Prospekt Slavy, Dunayskaya, and Shushary, was opened.

Mezhdunarodnaya is built under the corner of Bukharestskaya Street and Bely Kuna Street, in Frunzensky District. The name of the station means International and originates from the fact that many streets in the area (including these two) have been named to commemorate Eastern European politicians or cities.

Mezhdunarodnaya is a column-wall station. The construction started in 1986 but was frozen, and restarted in the 2000s. It was originally planned to be opened in August 2012, but the opening was postponed until December 2012, since the escalators were not delivered on time.

The entrance to the station is built into a shopping mall that goes under the similar name - "Mezhdunarodny".

== Transport ==
Buses: 12, 31, 54, 91, 95, 856. Trolleybuses: 35, 36. Trams: 25, 43, 45, 49.
