= Shushary (Saint Petersburg Metro) =

Saint Petersburg Metro Station

Coordinates: 59°49′12″N 30°25′58″E

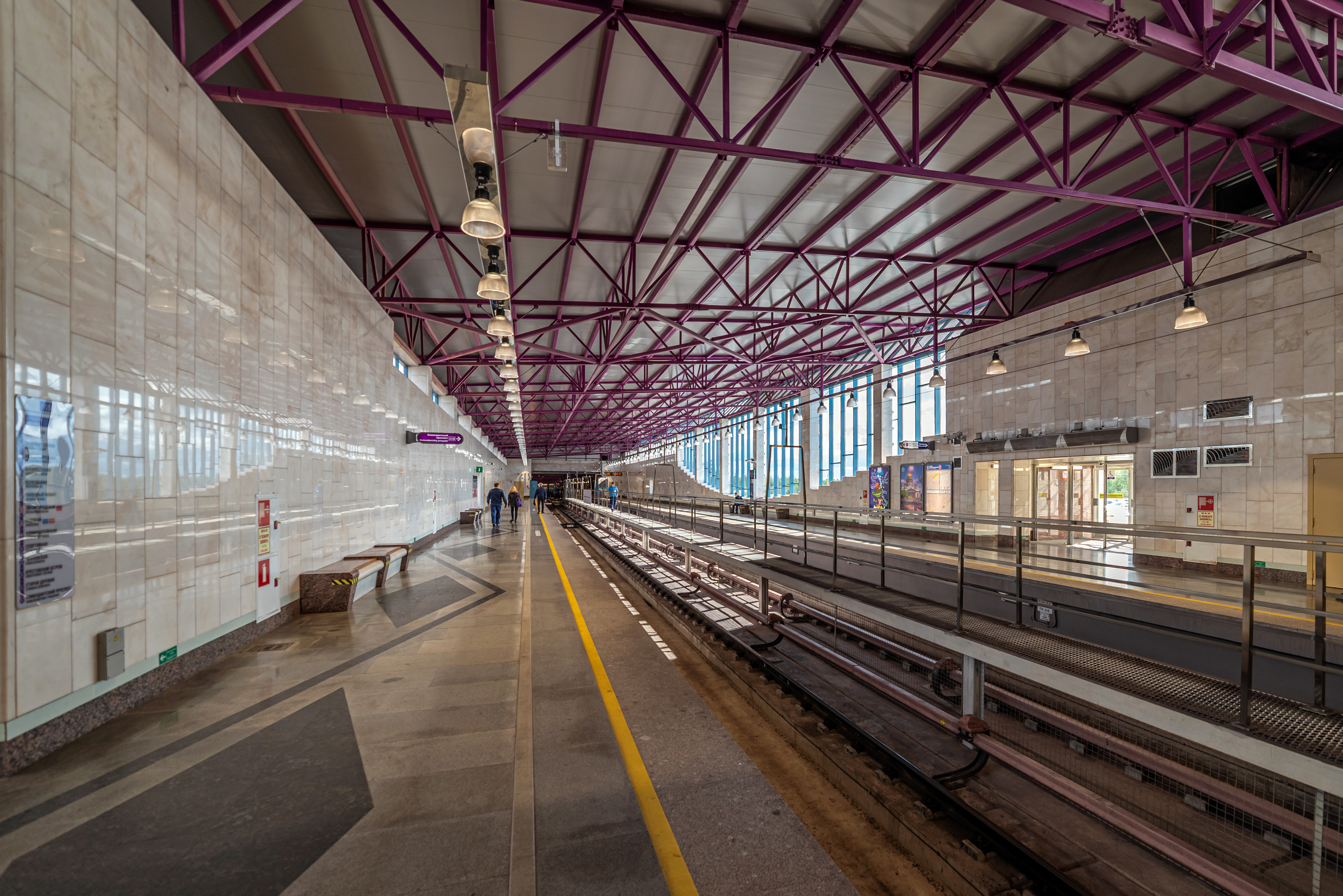

General information
- Other names: Yuzhnaya (proposed)
- System: Saint Petersburg Metro station
- Operator: Saint Petersburg Metro
- Line: Frunzensko–Primorskaya Line
- Platforms: 2 (Side platforms)
- Tracks: 2

Construction
- Structure type: At-grade
- Depth: 0 m (0 ft)

History
- Opened: 3 October 2019
- Electrified: Third rail

Services
Preceding station	Saint Petersburg Metro	Following station
Dunayskaya towards Komendantsky Prospekt	Line 5	Terminus
Location

Shushary (Russian: Шушары) is a Saint Petersburg Metro station on the Frunzensko-Primorskaya Line (Line 5) of the Saint Petersburg Metro. It was opened on 3 October 2019 as a part of the extension of the line to the south from Mezhdunarodnaya. The extension also included Prospekt Slavy and Dunayskaya stations. Shushary is the southeastern terminus of the line, behind Dunayskaya.

The station was initially planned as Yuzhnaya, and the name was sometimes used in official communications.

Shushary is built outside of the Saint Petersburg Ring Road, in Frunzensky District. The name refers to the settlement of Shushary.

== Transport ==
Buses: 197A, 254, 324, 330.
