= Vladimirskaya (Saint Petersburg Metro) =

Saint Petersburg Metro Station

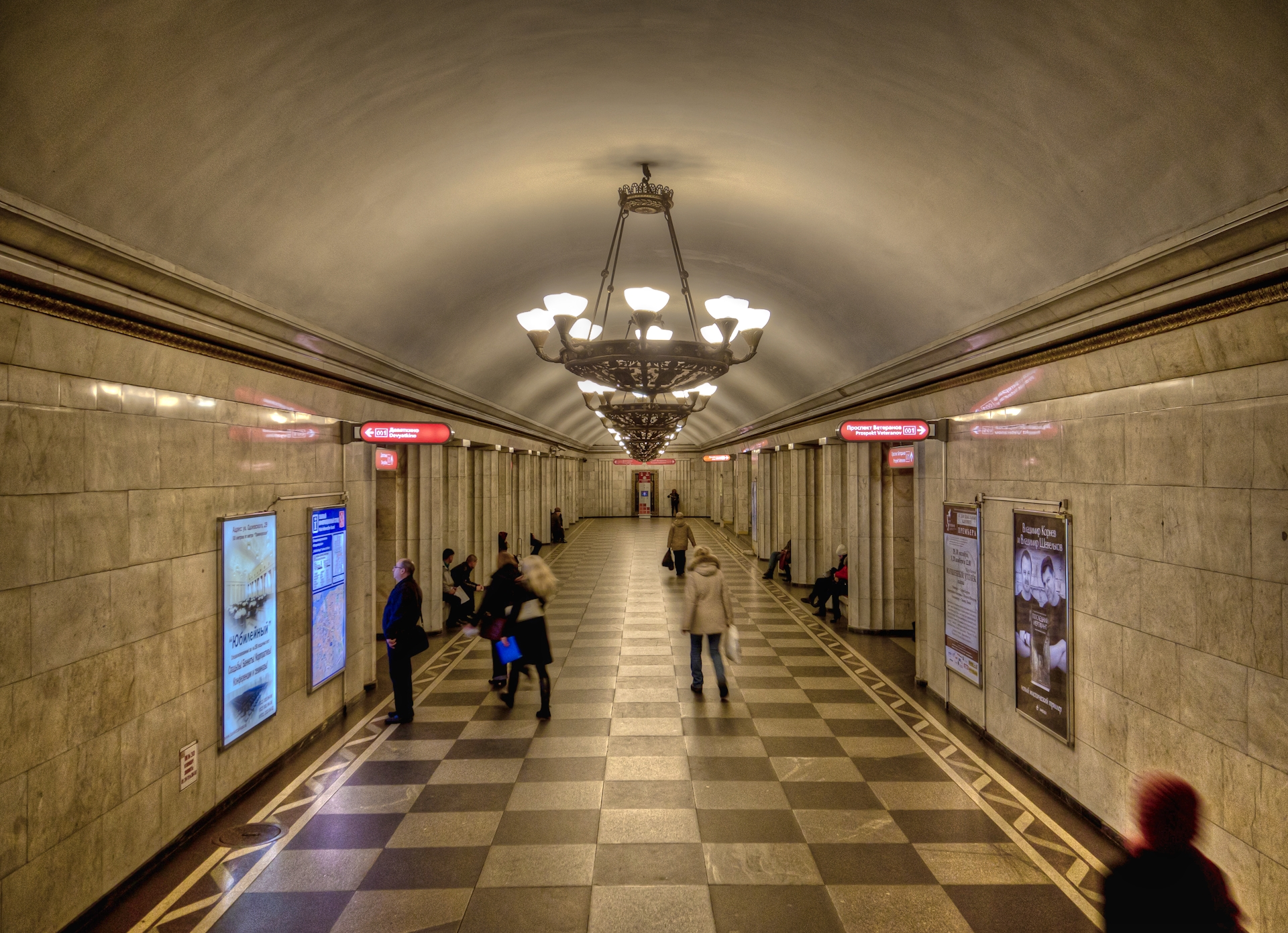
- Station Hall

General information
- Location: Tsentralny District; Saint Petersburg; Russia
- Coordinates: 59°55′39.14″N 30°20′52.66″E
- System: Saint Petersburg Metro station
- Owner: Saint Petersburg Metro
- Line: Kirovsko–Vyborgskaya Line
- Platforms: 1 (Island platform)
- Tracks: 2

Construction
- Structure type: Underground
- Depth: ≈55 m (180 ft)

History
- Opened: 15 November 1955; 70 years ago
- Electrified: Third rail

Services
Preceding station	Saint Petersburg Metro	Following station
Ploshchad Vosstaniya towards Devyatkino	Line 1	Pushkinskaya towards Prospekt Veteranov
Spasskaya towards Gorny Institut	Line 4 transfer at Dostoyevskaya	Ligovsky Prospekt towards Ulitsa Dybenko
Route map
Location

Vladimirskaya (Russian: Влади́мирская) is a station of the Saint Petersburg Metro opened on 15 November 1955.
