= Cathedral of the Vladimir Icon of the Mother of God =

Russian Orthodox church in St. Petersburg, Russia

Coordinates: 59.9282°N 30.3484°E

Cathedral of the Vladimir Icon of the Mother of God (Russian: Собор Владимирской иконы Божией Матери) is a Russian Orthodox cathedral, dedicated to Our Lady of Vladimir and located at 20 Vladimirsky Prospect, St. Petersburg, Russia. The avenue takes its name from the church.

The current five-domed church was built next to Vladimirsky Market between 1761 and 1769. The church's design, frequently ascribed to Pietro Antonio Trezzini, straddles the line between Baroque and Neoclassicism. The building has two stories, with the lower church dedicated to Saint John Damascene. The detached belfry is a fine work of mature Neoclassicism, built to Quarenghi's design in 1791. The portico, chapel, fence, and outbuildings were added in the 19th century.

The interior of the church features an elaborate Baroque iconostasis, transferred from the Anichkov Palace chapel in 1808. When the 900th anniversary of the Christianisation of Russia was celebrated in 1888, the church underwent restoration. The most famous of its parishioners was Fyodor Dostoevsky.

The church was closed in 1932, restored to the Russian Orthodox Church in 1989 and named a cathedral in 2000. It gives its name to the Vladimirsky Avenue and Vladimirskaya Square. The church is accessible by the station Vladimirskaya of Line 1 of the Saint Petersburg Metro and the station Dostoyevskaya of Line 4.

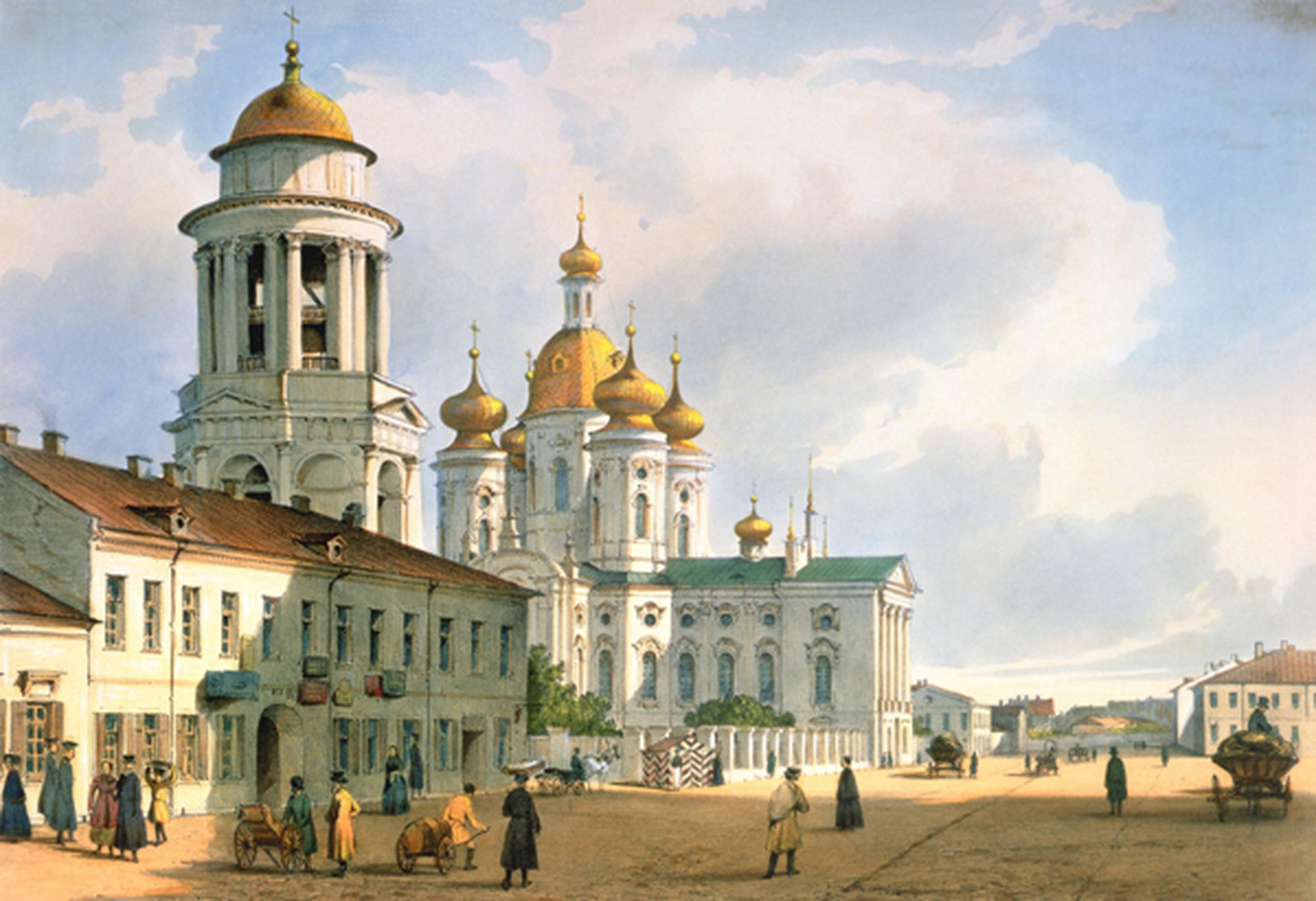
The Vladimirsky Avenue in 1840

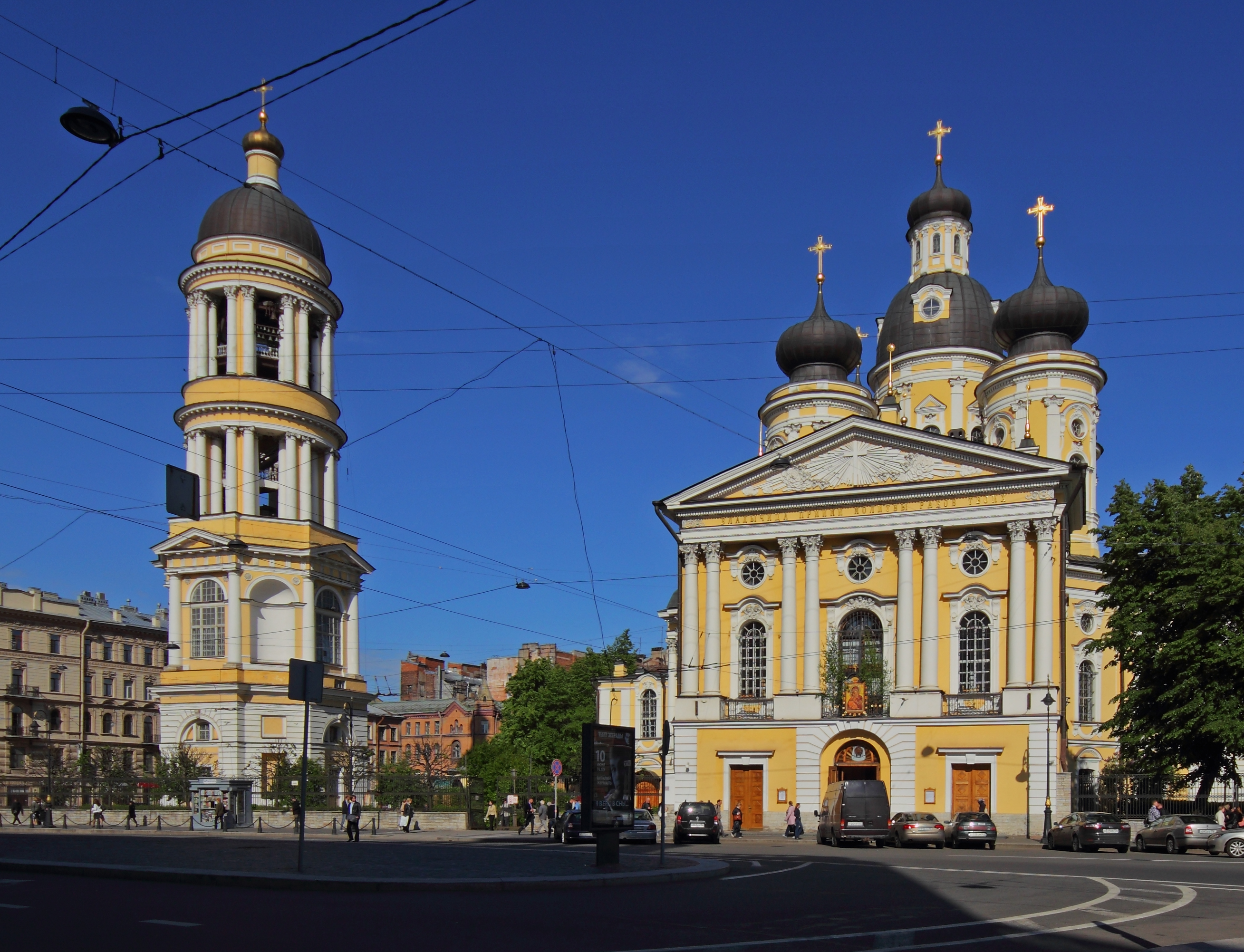
The church in 2012

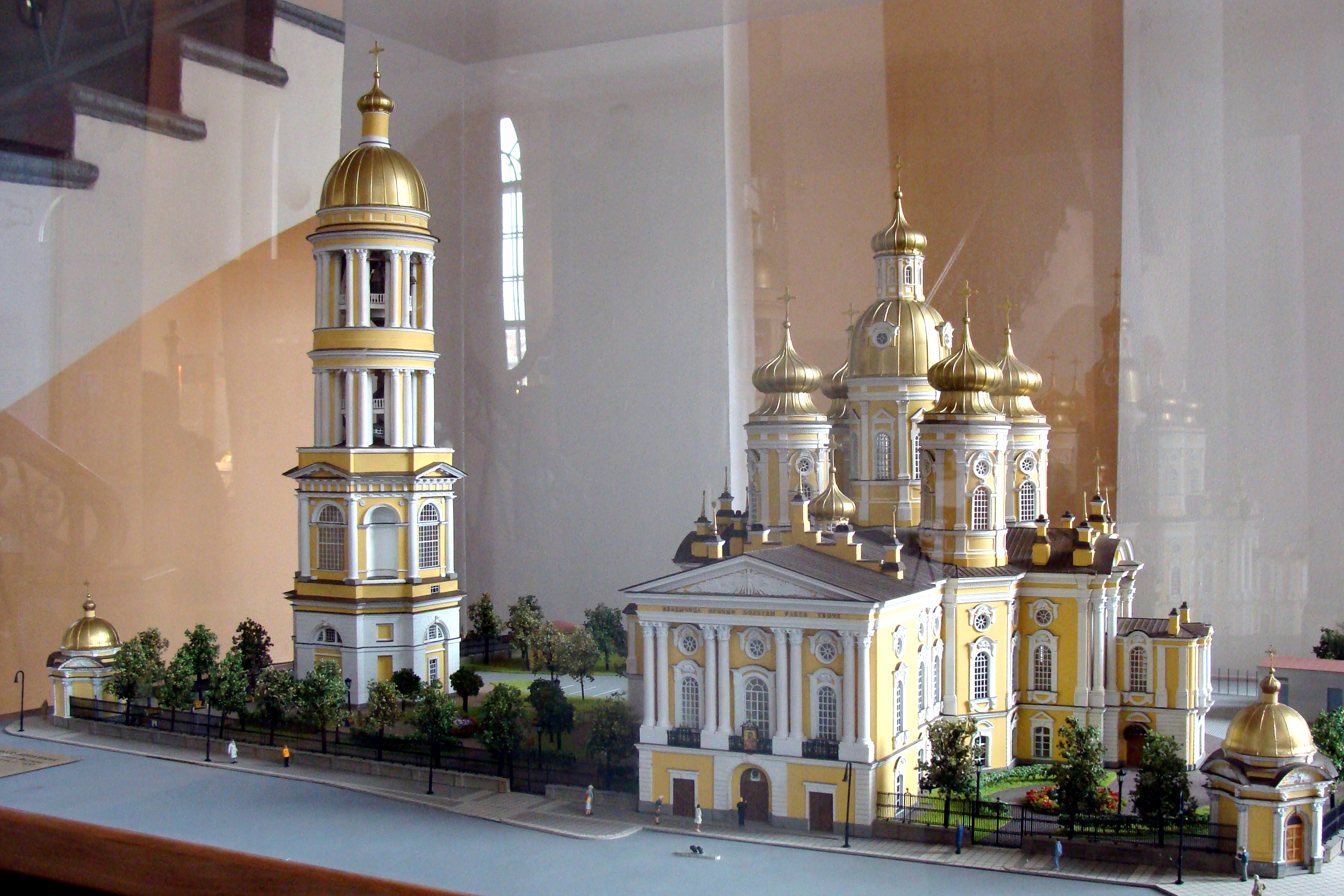
Scale model of the church inside it

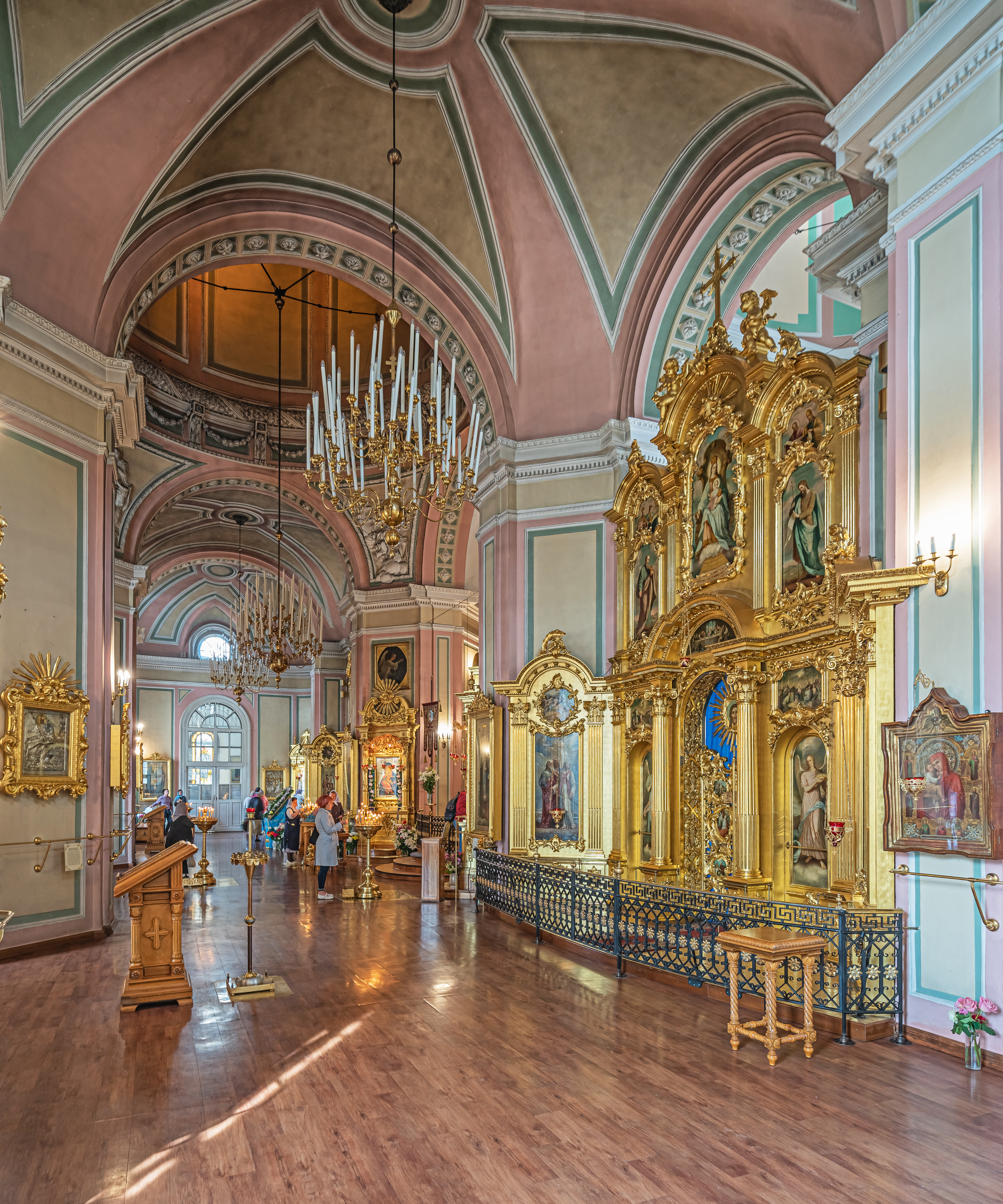
Interior of the upper church

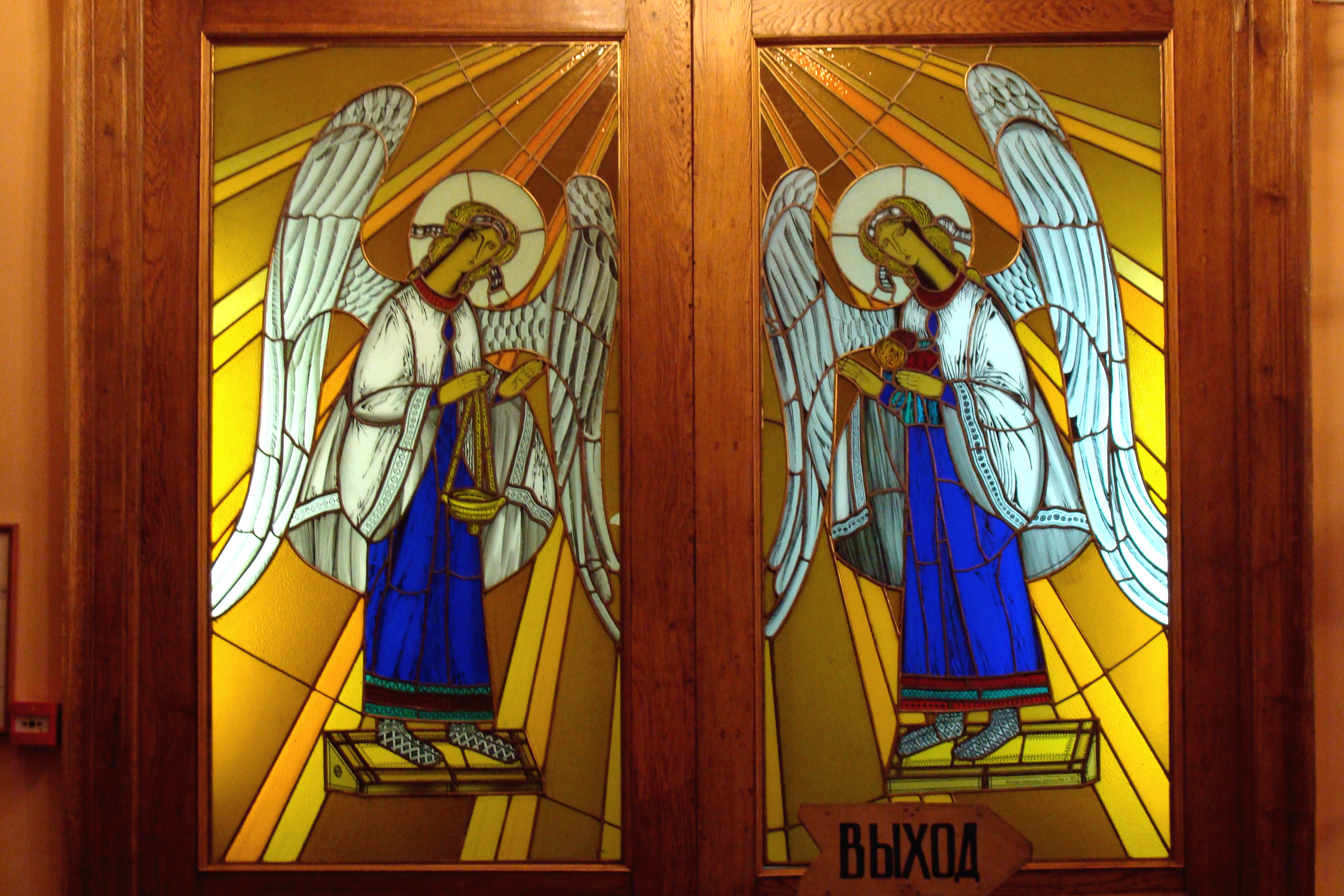
The stained-glass inner door

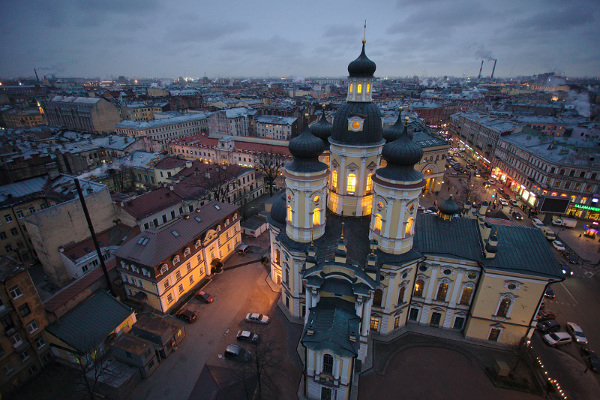
View from the belfry
