= Ladozhskaya (Saint Petersburg Metro) =

Saint Petersburg Metro Station

Ladozhskaya Ладожская
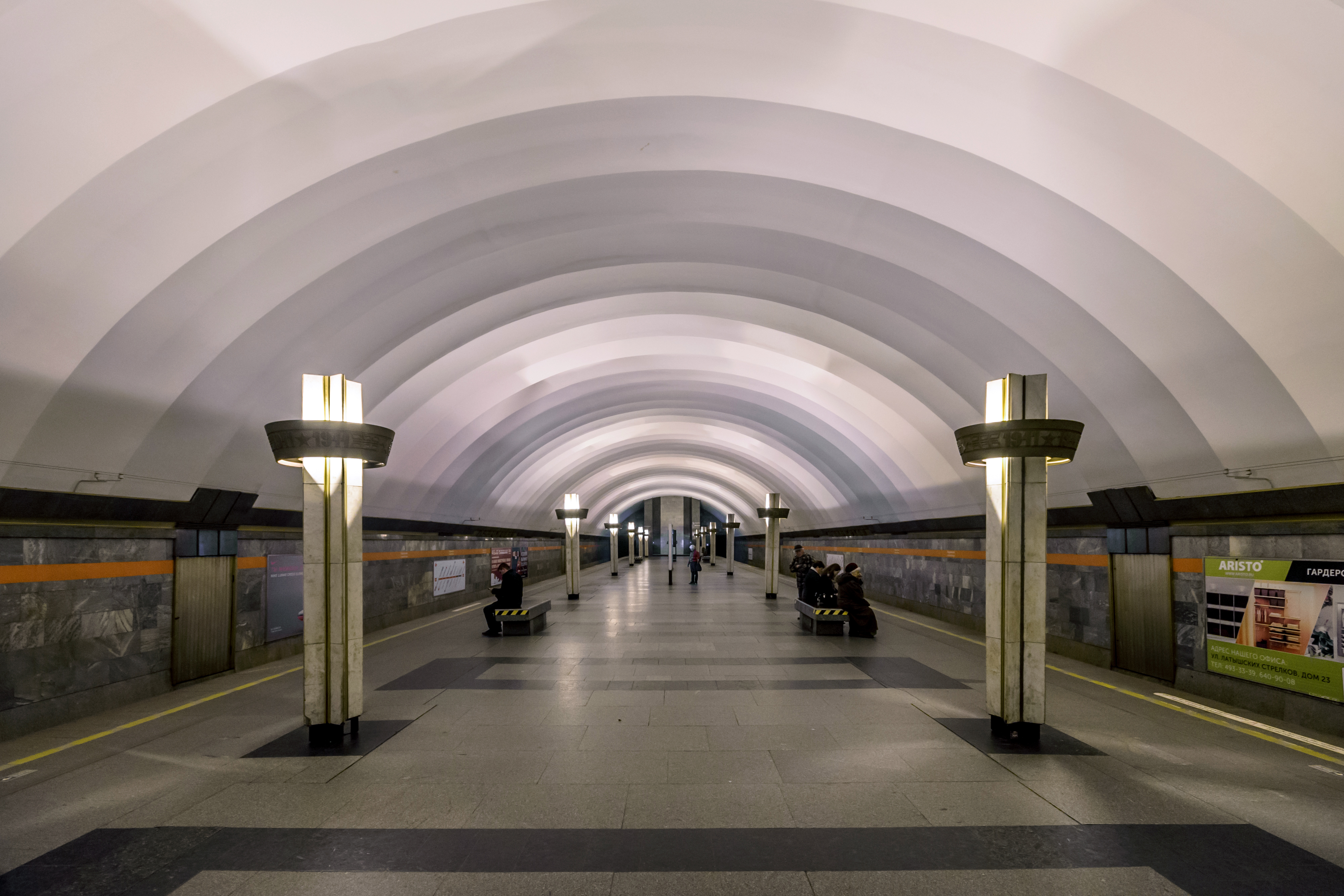
- Station Hall

General information
- Location: Krasnogvardeysky District; Saint Petersburg; Russia
- Coordinates: 59.932444°N 30.439306°E
- System: Saint Petersburg Metro station
- Operator: Saint Petersburg Metro
- Line: Pravoberezhnaya Line
- Platforms: 1 (Island platform)
- Tracks: 2

Construction
- Structure type: Underground
- Depth: ≈61 m (200 ft)
- Parking: Yes

History
- Opened: December 30, 1985
- Electrified: Third rail

Services
| Preceding station | Saint Petersburg Metro | Following station |
|---|---|---|
| Novocherkasskaya towards Gorny Institut | Line 4 | Prospekt Bolshevikov towards Ulitsa Dybenko |
Location

Ladozhskaya (Russian: Лáдожская) is a station on the Line 4 of Saint Petersburg Metro, opened on December 30, 1985.

== Transport ==
Buses: 5, 21, 24, 27, 30, 46, 77, 82, 92, 123, 131, 183, 185, 222, 271, 295, 429, 453, 462, 531, 532, 533, 860Л. Trolleybuses: 22. Trams: 7, 8, 59, 63, 64. Minibuses: 430, 430A, 531A, 462P.
