= Oktyabrsky Concert Hall =

Concert hall in St. Petersburg, Russia

Oktyabrsky Big Concert Hall
- Большой концертный зал «Октя́брьский» БКЗ «Октябрьский»
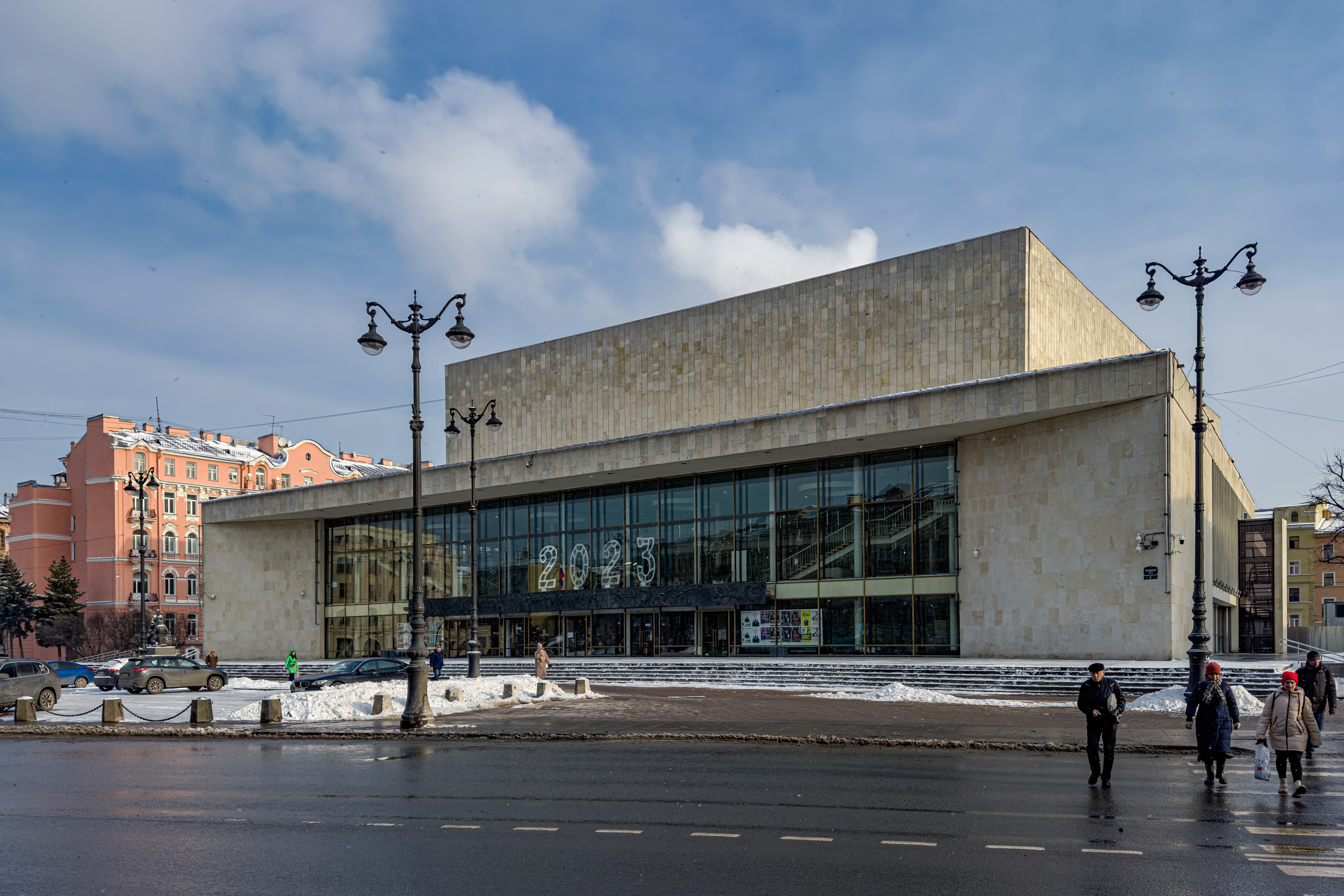
- Exterior of the concert hall
- Interactive map of Oktyabrsky Big Concert Hall
- Address: Ligovsky Prospekt, 6 Saint Petersburg 191036 Russia
- Location: Greek Square
- Coordinates: 59°56′08″N 30°21′55″E
- Capacity: 3,727

Construction
- Groundbreaking: 1961
- Opened: 25 October 1967
- Renovated: 2007
- Architect: Aleksandr Zhuk

Website
- Venue Website (in Russian)

The Oktyabrsky Big Concert Hall (BKZ) (Russian: Большой концертный зал «Октя́брьский», romanized: Bol'shoy kontsertnyy zal «Oktyábr'skiy», Big Concert Hall "October") is a theatre located in Saint Petersburg, Russia. It hosts variety actors, rock musicians, and also dance and ballet collectives. Located in the Greek Square, it opened October 1967, inaugurated 50 years after the October Revolution.

The director of the hall, since 1988, has been Emma Lavrinovich.

== History ==
The venue was built on the grounds of a former Greek Orthodox church (formerly known as the Greek Square). This is reflected in Joseph Brodsky's poem A Stop in a Desert.

The construction took place between 1961 and 1967, by a group headed by Aleksandr Zhuk. The project involved architects Valentin Kamensky and Jean Verzhbitsky, and the engineers Galkin and Maksimov. The building silhouette is strictly geometrical, the facade is decorated with a huge stained-glass window. Over the front entrance, there is a bronze frieze by sculptor Mikhail Anikushin.

In 2007, the concert hall underwent necessary repairs. The works covered all systems of the building, taking place from July until October 2009.

== Noted performers ==
- A-ha
- Aleksandr Panayotov
- Alla Pugacheva
- Cesária Évora
- Charles Aznavour
- Cliff Richard
- Dean Reed
- Duke Ellington
- Elena Vaenga
- Elton John
- Emin Agalarov
- Gary Moore
- Glenn Hughes
- James Blunt
- José Carreras
- Joseph Kobzon
- Julio Iglesias
- Klavdiya Shulzhenko
- Leonid Utyosov
- Lyube
- Lyudmila Zykina
- Мельница
- Mireille Mathieu
- Mstislav Rostropovich
- Nadezhda Kadysheva
- Patricia Kaas
- Salvatore Adamo
- Sviatoslav Richter
- Valery Leontiev
- Yngwie Malmsteen
- Whitesnake

== Notes ==
1."Grand", "Large", "Big" and "Great" are all accepted translations of «Большой». However, "big" is most commonly used within the media in reference to the concert hall.
