= Novocherkasskaya (Saint Petersburg Metro) =

Saint Petersburg Metro Station

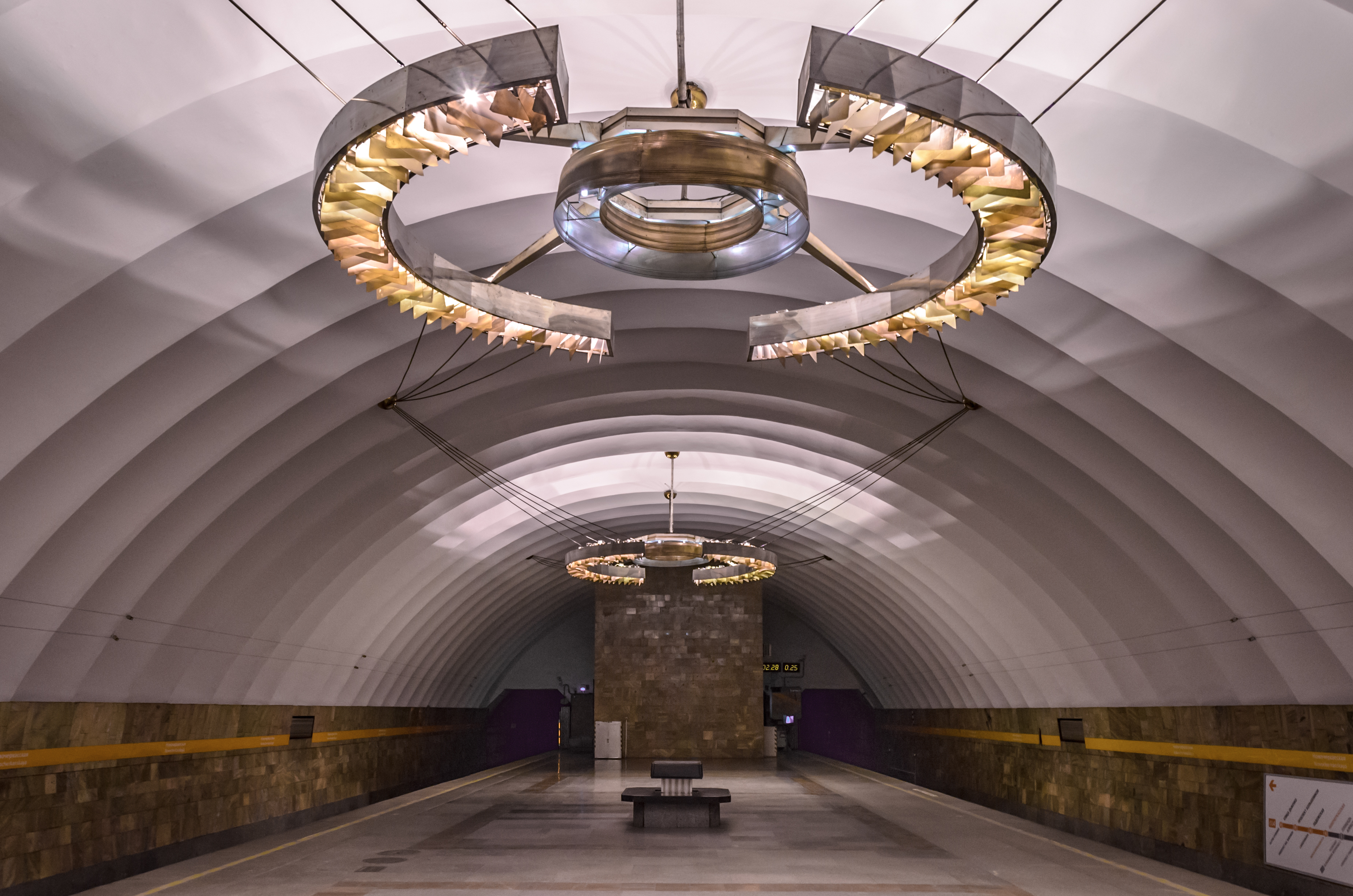
- Station Hall

General information
- Location: Krasnogvardeysky District; Saint Petersburg; Russia
- Coordinates: 59.929056°N 30.411778°E
- System: Saint Petersburg Metro station
- Operator: Saint Petersburg Metro
- Line: Pravoberezhnaya Line
- Platforms: 1 (Island platform)
- Tracks: 2

Construction
- Structure type: Underground
- Depth: ≈61 m (200 ft)

History
- Opened: December 30, 1985
- Electrified: Third rail

Services
Preceding station	Saint Petersburg Metro	Following station
Ploshchad Alexandra Nevskogo II towards Gorny Institut	Line 4	Ladozhskaya towards Ulitsa Dybenko
Route map
Location

Novocherkasskaya (Russian: Новочерка́сская) is a station on the Line 4 of Saint Petersburg Metro, opened on December 30, 1985. The station was planned to be named Zanevskaya, but it was ultimately called Krasnogvardeyskaya until 1992; the station's name was changed after its namesake, the Krasnogvardeysky Avenue, was renamed to Novocherkassky. The station is unique as it does not have its own building above ground; one must enter through an underground pedestrian crossing.

== Station Design ==
The station's vestibule design is dedicated to the Red Army and its fight for power in the Russian Revolution; the escalators feature a mosaic at the bottom portal, the walls are also lined with red marble.
