= Prospekt Bolshevikov (Saint Petersburg Metro) =

Saint Petersburg Metro Station

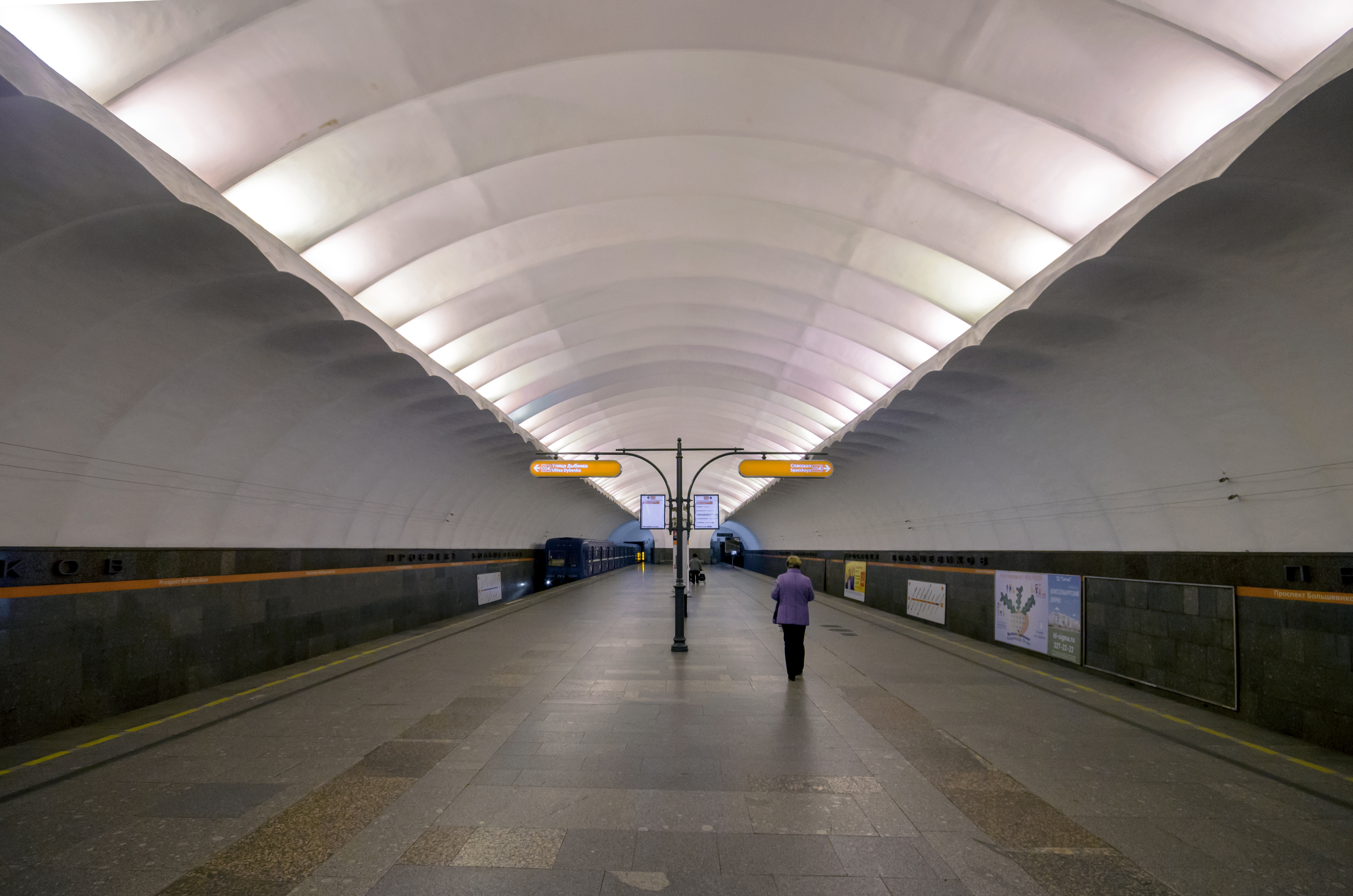
- Station Hall

General information
- Location: Nevsky District; Saint Petersburg; Russia
- Coordinates: 59.919917°N 30.46675°E
- System: Saint Petersburg Metro station
- Operator: Saint Petersburg Metro
- Line: Pravoberezhnaya Line
- Platforms: 1 (Island platform)
- Tracks: 2

Construction
- Structure type: Underground

History
- Opened: December 30, 1985
- Electrified: Third rail

Services
| Preceding station | Saint Petersburg Metro | Following station |
|---|---|---|
| Ladozhskaya towards Gorny Institut | Line 4 | Ulitsa Dybenko Terminus |
Route map
Location

Prospekt Bolshevikov (Russian: Проспект Большевиков) is a station on the Line 4 of Saint Petersburg Metro, opened on December 30, 1985.

== Transport ==
Buses: 12, 102, 118, 140, 161, 164, 169, 191, 255A, 255Б, 264, 268, 288. Trolleybuses: 28, 33, 43. Trams: 10, 27, 65, A. Minibuses: K-801, K-801A.
