= Spasskaya =

- Spasskaya Tower of the Moscow Kremlin
- Spasskaya (Saint Petersburg Metro)
