= Ligovsky Avenue =

Major street in Saint Petersburg, Russia

Coordinates: 59.9269°N 30.3585°E

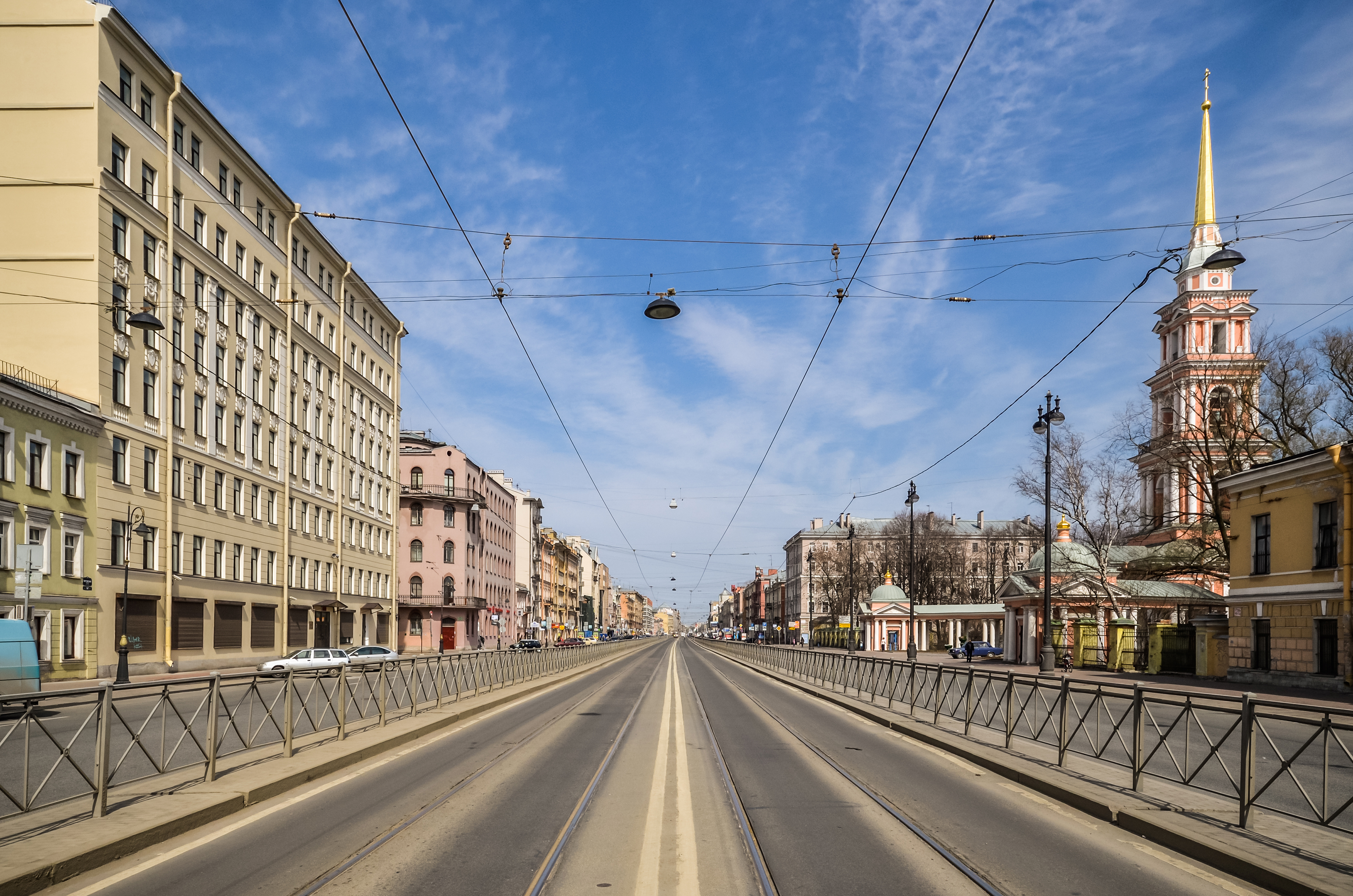

Ligovsky Prospekt (Russian: Лиговский проспект) is a street in the historic centre of Saint Petersburg. It begins at a T-crossing with Nekrasova Street, runs southwest, crosses Nevsky Prospect next to Moskovsky Railway Station, and ends at the Moscow Triumphal Gate as a T-crossing with Moskovsky Avenue. The name of the street originates from the Liga River, currently the Dudergofka.

Between 1718-25, when Saint Petersburg was the capital of Russia, construction began on the Ligovsky Canal under the direction of Grigory Grigorevich to provide water to the fountains in the Summer Garden or to transport stone blocks to the city center. The canal was drained gradually between 1891 and 1926. In the 19th century, the area was populated by workers, but eventually it was gentrified.

The road is near the site of the old Novgorod road. The road was called "Moskovskaya" since 1739, then "Ligovsky Canal Embankment". In 1892 the street became "Ligovskaya Street", and between 1952 and 1956 it was called "Stalingradsky Avenue". Since 1956 it has carried the current name.

There is a tram line running along Ligovsky Avenue in the central segment of the street.

== List of buildings ==
Name	Address number	Description	References
Gymnasium of Y. G. Gurevich	No. 1	The building was built in the Early 19th Century. The building was a boy's gymnasium between 1870 and 1875, when it was purchased by Innokenty Mikhailovich Sibiryakov and rebuilt later that year by Alexander Dmitrievich Schilling and Vasily Ivanovich Tokarev. The building was donated in 1893 to Professor P. F. Lesgaft. The building was a Male Gymnasium until 1918. The building was repaired in 2012-2013 by Lenstroyrekonstruktsiya LLC.	
Petersburg Research Institute of Phthisiopulmonology	No. 2-4	Opened in February 1923 under the command of Professor Abram Yakovlevich Sternberg. The building was built in 1869-1871 in the Neo-Gothic style by Rudolf Bogdanovich and Otto Pius Hippius as an evangelical hospital.	
Apartment building of Praskovia Mikhailovna von Anrep and Alexei Nikolaevich Zinoviev	No. 3-5	The building was built in 1878 by Tatski Christian Christianovich on the site of an 1820s wooden house belonging to Anna Karlovna Serova. The land was previously owned by Carl Ludwig Hablitz in the Early 19th Century. Maria Vikentyevna Koryavova purchased the house in November 1893. In January 1894 Praskovia Mikhailovna von Anrep purchased the apartment for her and her husband Vasily. He purchased No 5 off a peasant, A. A. Soikin. A new building was built on the site by Tatski, and extended in 1909 by Mikhail Gavrilovich Zatsepin.	
Greek Church of St. Demetrios of Thessaloniki	No. 6	Built in 1861-1865 by Roman Kuzmim. The foundation stone was laid on June 6th 1861 in memory of Demetrius of Thessaloniki. The church was consecrated on November 12th 1865 by Metropolitan Isidore, and was attended by Alexander Gorchakov and the Greek ambassador. The church was restored in 1886 by Andrei Afanasyev. The church closed on January 11, 1939 and subsequently housed a military training centre. The church was hit by a German bomb in World War II, causing the building to remain dilapidated until demolition in 1962. The church is referenced in the poem "A Stop in a Desert" by Joseph Brodsky.	
Mansion of Pavel Ivanovich Velitsky and Semyon Ilyich Penyakov.	No. 6	Mansion of Pavel Ivanovich Velitsky and Semyon Ilyich Penyakov. The building was built in 1863 by Peter Konstantinovich Sverchkov for Velitsky. The house was purchased by Penyakov in 1905, and rebuilt 1905-1906 by Mikhail Alexandrovich Songailo, who built an unfinished extension of the house in 1912. The house was demolished in 1967 to make way for the Oktyabrsky Grand Concert Hall.	
Oktyabrsky Grand Concert Hall.	No. 6	Built in 1962-1967 by Aleksandr Vladimirovich Zhuk, Valentin Aleksandrovich Kamensky, and Zhan Matveevych Verzhbitsky. A bronze frieze of Vladimir Lenin is above the main entrance, designed by Mikhail Anikushin.	
Oktyabrsky Business Centre	No. 6B	Business centre built in 2012-2014 by AMM Project on the site of the ticket office of the Oktyabrsky Grand Concert Hall.	
Children's Hospital of Prince P. G. of Oldenburg	No. 8	Extant from the 1860s-1890s. The main building was built in 1866-1869 by Caesar Albertovich.	
Apartment Building of A. A. Grigorieva	No.9	The building was built in 1879-1880 by Christian Christianovich Tatsky.	
Oktyabrskaya Hotel	No. 10	The building was built in 1847-1857 by Aleksandr Petrovich Gemilian on the site of the Elephant Yard, one of the first Menageries in Russia, where elephants were brought from Persia. The hotel was originally owned by Count Ya. I. Stenbock-Fermor, before being sold to Princess Vachnadze. The building was extended in the 1870s by I. I. Klimov, and in the 1890s by V. I. Solovyov, where 85 room hotel was increased to 150 rooms, along with a 500 seat restaurant. Until 1890 the hotel was called "Znamenskaya", and was later renamed to "Bolshaya Severnaya" until 1918. The Ligovsky Avenue building was rebuilt in 1960.	
House of A. Ya. Reshetnikova	No. 11	The house was built in 1871 by G. A. Soloviev on the site of a Late 18th Century house belonging to N. F. Gesling, until the house was sold in 1871. The building was rebuilt in 1877 by G. A. Soloviev. The house was owned by Nikolai Arkadyevich Vitashevsky between 1897 and 1917.	
Shavrin's House	No. 13	Built in 1829 by Z. F. Krasnopevkov, and rebuilt in 1866 by P. I. Kudryavtsev. It was demolished in 2006-2007 for the construction of the Ligovsky Business Centre, and rebuilt in 2011 by Dmitry Lagutin.	
Ligovsky Business Centre	No. 15	The building was built in 2007 by AM Reinberg, December 32 and AM Sharov.	
Vosstaniya Square Second Pavilion	No. 16	The building opened on August 30, 1960 on the site of a Pre Revolutionary house. The building provides access to the Moskovsky Railway Station and Ploshchad Vosstaniya metro station. The building was designed by Aron Solomonovich Getskin and V. P. Shuvalova. The building was renovated in 2004. The metro station was the first in the city to have two exits.	
Apartment house of G. P. Makarova	No. 17	Built 1885-1886 in Eclectic style by Mikhail Andreev Andreevich.	
Offices of the Moskovsky Railway Station.	No. 18	It was built 1895-1898 by Anton Antonovich Klevshchinsky.	
Apartment building of Ekaterina and Helena Vasilievna.	No. 19	The building was built in 1878 by Mikhail Andreevich Andreev in Eclectic style for Ivan Ivanovich Shaposhnikov. Ekaterina lived here until 1907. The editorial office of the sports magazine "Hercules" was located here.	
Apartment building of S. Y. Bogdanov	No. 21	Built in 1894 by Pyotr Ivanovich Gilyov to replace a previous house resided in by V. A. Strom. Between 1897 and 1899 the building was home to artist Nikolay Karazin. The building was heavily damaged in WW2.	
Shelter of the Society for the Care of Poor Children in St. Petersburg	No. 21B	Built in 1866 by Egor Ivanovich Winterhalter in Eclectic style. The building was formerly the home of A. I. Vargunin, paper manufacturer. Fyodor Dostoevsky borrowed paper from the Vargunins in the 1870s for "The House of the Dead", "The Idiot", and "Demons".	
Church of St. Nicanor the Apostle	No. 24	Built in 1853 by Vladislav Pavlovich Lvov using funds from the House of Charity's benefactors. Now demolished.	
Apartment building of the St. Petersburg Insurance Society	No. 25	The building was built in 1854 by Konstantin Egorovich Egorov, and rebuilt in 1857 by Pyotr Konstantinovich Sverchkov. Fyodor Dostoevsky lived in apartment 17 in the building between Late 1873 and May 1874 while he worked at the Grazhdanin magazine office. Other residents included Dmitry Mamin-Sibiryak and Aleksandr Morozov.	
House of Culture of Railway Workers	No. 26	Built in 1828 as a House of Charity by Anton Matveevich Kutsi. Extended in 1852 by Vladislav Pavlovich Lvov. The buildings were renovated in 1858 by Evgeny Alekseevich Pergov using funds from V. F. and I. F. Gromov. Demolished in 1996.	
Bush's Tobacco Factory	No. 29	Built in 1882 by Vasily Vasilyevich Shtrom and in 1886 by Fyodor Borisovich Nagel. Russian economist Nikolai Annensky lived here between 1895 and 1897. Russian-Ukrainian writer Vladimir Korolenko lived here between 1895 and 1896.	
Galeria Shopping Mall	No. 30	Nos. 24, 26, 30, 34-36, 38, 42 were demolished in 1996 for the construction of the Saint Petersburg–Moscow railway, but this didn't happen, with the site becoming the Galeria Shopping Mall. Construction on the mall began in March 2008 using designs by Grigoriev and Partners. It was built by Renaissance Construction, with ICS, IKAB, and FS and engineering consultants, and MACE Ltd as managers. It opened in late 2010 after being completed that year. It is the largest mall in historic Saint Petersburg.	
Kreitan family house	No. 31	This plot belonged to Sculptor, Pyotr Fedorovich Kreitan in the Early 19th Century, where it is said his sons, Vasily and Fyodor were born. The building was later demolished and replaced by a Stalinist Neoclassical building of 1936.	
House of Abram Genoch Kaplun and Aron Abramovich Kaplun	No.33	Right part built 1897-1898 by Otto Ludvigovoch Ignatovich for the owner A. A. Kaplun, who owned the building until 1910. The landlord from 1912 was Pyotr Fedorovich Morozov, who created the Versailles and the Danube hotels. The building was built on the site of a previous Early 19th Century house owned by the Dmitrievs. The left part was rebuilt by V. V. Chaplin in 1894.	
House of Abram Genoch Kaplun and Aron Abramovich Kaplun	No. 35	Built in 1897-1898 by Otto Ludvigovoch Ignatovich on the site of an Early 19th Century house belonging to the Dmitrievs. Pyotr Fedorovich Morozov became the landlord in 1912 and created the Versailles and the Danube hotels. A confectionary factory called S. Vasiliev was also located here in the 1870s, with a chocolate factory called "Mignon" opening here in 1912.	
Kopeikin Button Factory	No. 42	Built in 1877-1879 by Aleksandr Ivanovich Polikarpov as the Kopeikin Button Factory, and rebuilt in 1888 by Polikarpov. The factory produced buttons and stamped metal objects for uniforms. The factory closed in 1917 and became the Proveshcheniye Theatre, and later became a lecture hall in Autumn 1924, and closed in 1996. The building was demolished the same year and is now the Galeria Mall.	
V.E. Pestrikov "Metropolitan" Hotel	No. 43-45	Built in 1902 by G. S. Gavrilov, and rebuilt in 1913 by V. M. Orlov.	
Tenement house of F. I. Korovin.	No.47	Built in 1878 by Aleksandr Vasilevich Ivanov. Graffiti of musician Keith Flint appeared on the building on July 18th 2020, and was painted over in May 2021.	
Kokorevsky Warehouses	No. 50	Built 1873-1886 for the Northern Insurance Company. The buildings were rebuilt in 1903 by Ivan Merz. The buildings were due to be demolished, but were saved in 2025 after protests.	
Malozemova House	No. 56	Built in 1878 by Vasily Fedorovich von Hecker. The building was demolished in 2017 and is now the Ibis Hotel.	
San Galli Iron Foundry and Mechanical Works	No. 60-62	Founded as a blacksmith workshop in 1853 by Franz San Galli. New buildings were later constructed in 1860 by K. F. Feyereysen, and also by Karl Karlovich Rahau, Dmitry Dmitrievich Zaitsev, Aleksandr Aleksandrovich Dokushevsky, Nikolai Aleksandrovich Gazelmeyer, Ivan Ivanovich Gornostaev and in 1890 by Vladimir Kurzanov. Some buildings were demolished during Soviet times when the factory was named Koperator, and more were demolished in 2008.	
A. L. Sagalov Apartments	No. 91	Built in 1913-1914 by Aleksandr Lishnevsky and Abram Berlin. The building was inspired by the Pietinena House in Vyborg, and from the general Art Nouveau and Neoclassical styles. A maternity hospital with 28 rooms later opened in the building, with reconstruction in the 1930s by A. I. Klimov, E. N. Dobrovolsky, N. N. Aistov. The roof caught fire in September 2018 and residents were evacuated.	
Holy Cross Church	No. 128	Built in 1748 in the Baroque style, it was rebuilt in 1848-1852 in the Neo-Baroque style by Igor Dimmert	
Praskovya Stepanovna Kuritsyna Apartments	No. 139	Built in 1908 in the Art Nouveau style by Boris Yakovlevich Zonn. The building façade was repaired in 2007. The building was purchased by Kirill Yudanov in Early 2017 who renovated the interior of the house.	
Aleksandr Petrovich Volkov Mansion	No. 146	Built in 1862 by Vasily Vasilyevich Shtrom. The building was home to the Moscow Volost Government from 1895-1900. The building was restored in 2010-2011 and opened in March of that year by the governor, V. I. Matvienko.	
Sever Cinema	No. 153	Built in 1914 by Mikhail Pokorny for A. V. Eliseev. The cinema was the first cinema in Saint Petersburg to be in a standalone cinema building. The cinema was called Pchyolka in 1921-1922, in 1931-1939 it was called Gudok, and since 1951 it was called Sever. The cinema was rebuilt in 1957 with 600 new chairs installed, along with a modern film projection equipment, a new screen and ventilation systems. The cinema closed in 1979, until it re opened in 1992. It was demolished in 2008 to make way for the Ligov Shopping Mall.	
Ligovsky Baths	No. 269	Built in 1934 in Constructivist style by Nikolai Demkov. The building was rebuilt in 1961.	

== Transport ==
The Ligovsky Prospekt Metro Station opened on December 30, 1991, and was designed by Y. V. Eechko and N. V. Romashkin-Timanov. The station was repaired in 2014 at the cost of 147 million rubles, taking nearly a year.

A tram line ran down the street between 1915 and January 2007. A new tram line was launched on 17 November 2007. Trolleybus services were launched on the street on 19 June 2023.
