= Ligovsky Prospekt (Saint Petersburg Metro) =

Saint Petersburg Metro station

Ligovsky Prospekt Лиговский проспект
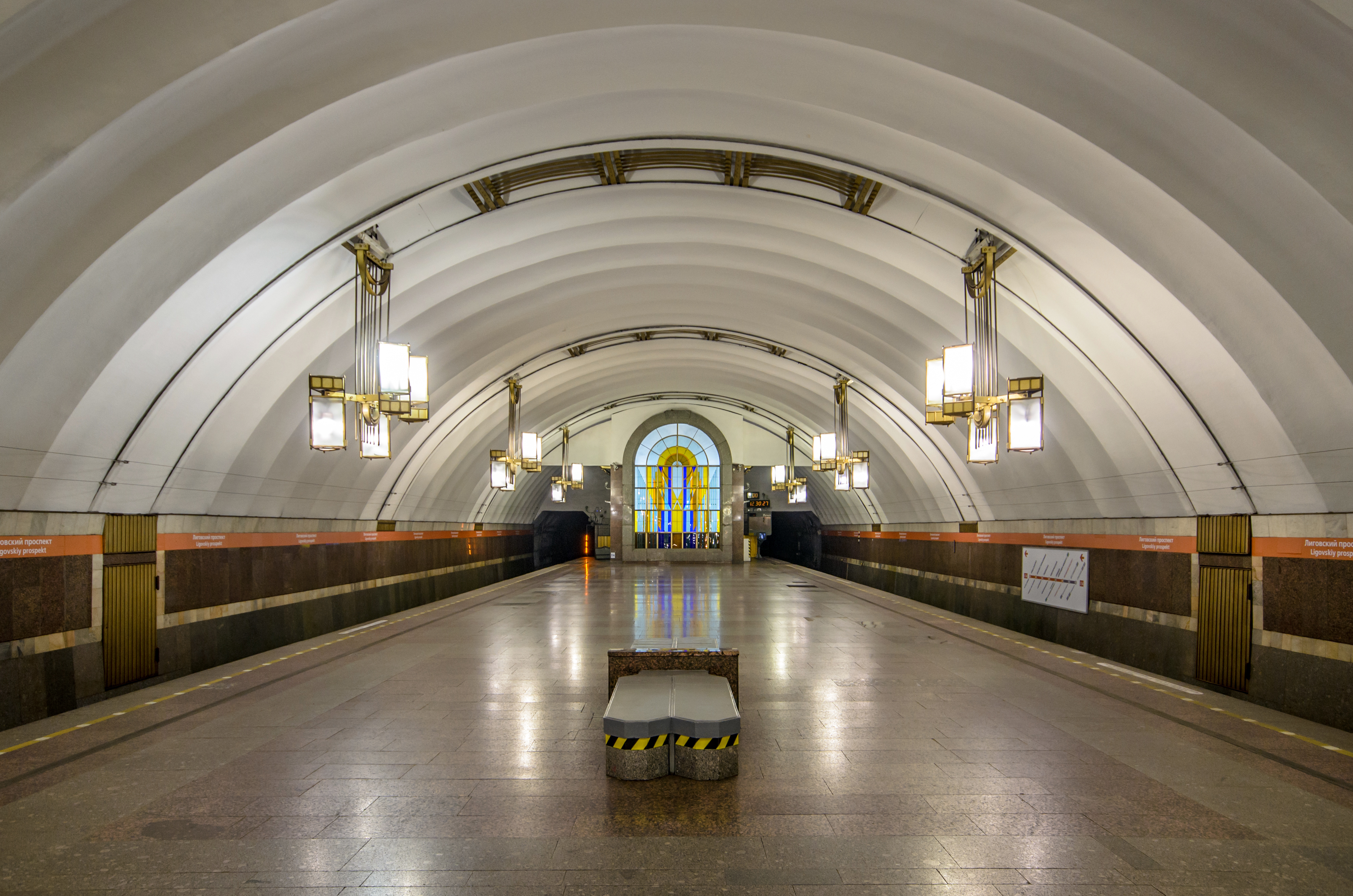
- Station Hall

General information
- Location: Tsentralny District; Saint Petersburg; Russia
- Coordinates: 59.920778°N 30.355222°E
- System: Saint Petersburg Metro station
- Operator: Saint Petersburg Metro
- Line: Pravoberezhnaya Line
- Platforms: 1 (Island platform)
- Tracks: 2

Construction
- Structure type: Underground
- Depth: ≈66 m (217 ft)

History
- Opened: December 30, 1991
- Electrified: Third rail

Services
Preceding station	Saint Petersburg Metro	Following station
Dostoyevskaya towards Gorny Institut	Line 4	Ploshchad Alexandra Nevskogo II towards Ulitsa Dybenko
Route map
Location

Ligovsky Prospekt (Russian: Ли́говский проспéкт) is a station on the Line 4 of Saint Petersburg Metro, opened on December 30, 1991.
