= Dostoyevskaya (Saint Petersburg Metro) =

Saint Petersburg Metro Station

Dostoyevskaya Достоевская
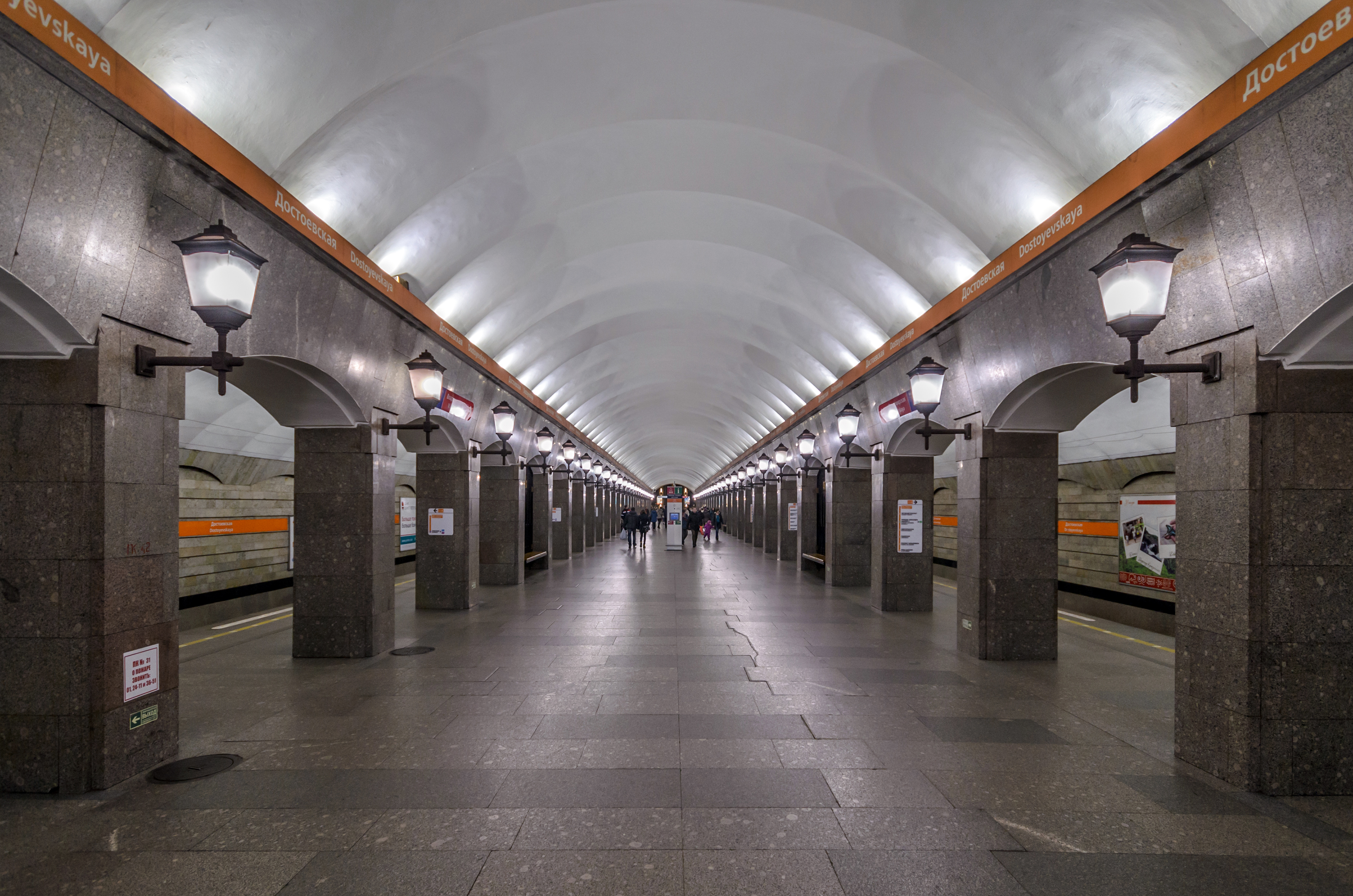
- Station Hall

General information
- Location: Tsentralny District; Saint Petersburg; Russia
- Coordinates: 59.928306°N 30.345917°E
- System: Saint Petersburg Metro station
- Operator: Saint Petersburg Metro
- Line: Pravoberezhnaya Line
- Platforms: 1 (Island platform)
- Tracks: 2

Construction
- Structure type: Underground
- Depth: ≈62 m (203 ft)

History
- Opened: December 30, 1991
- Electrified: Third rail

Services
Preceding station	Saint Petersburg Metro	Following station
Spasskaya towards Gorny Institut	Line 4	Ligovsky Prospekt towards Ulitsa Dybenko
Ploshchad Vosstaniya towards Devyatkino	Line 1 transfer at Vladimirskaya	Pushkinskaya towards Prospekt Veteranov
Route map
Location

Dostoyevskaya (Russian: Достоéвская) is a station on the Line 4 of the Saint Petersburg Metro, opened on December 30, 1991. Walkways connect Dostoyevskaya with Vladimirskaya metro station of the Kirovsko-Vyborgskaya Line. The namesake for this station is Fyodor Dostoevsky
