= Teatralnaya (Saint Petersburg Metro) =

Station under construction in Saint Petersburg, Russia

Teatralnaya Театральная

General information
- Location: Admiralteysky District; Saint Petersburg; Russia
- Coordinates: 59.926666°N 30.297222°E
- System: Saint Petersburg Metro station
- Line: Pravoberezhnaya Line
- Platforms: 1 (Island platform)
- Tracks: 2

Construction
- Structure type: Underground

History
- Opened: 2029 (planned)
- Electrified: Third rail

Services
| Preceding station | Saint Petersburg Metro | Following station |
Future services
| Gorny Institut Terminus | Line 4 | Spasskaya towards Ulitsa Dybenko |
Route map
Location

Teatralnaya (Russian: Театра́льная) is a station that is under construction on Line 4 of the Saint Petersburg Metro. It is in the Admiralteysky District of Saint Peterburg and is currently planned to open in 2029. It is named for Teatralnaya Ploshchad, or Theater Square, which is the location for several theaters, including the Mariinsky Theatre.

== Design and layout ==
The station will have two lobbies, one near the Mariinsky Theater and the second under Ulitsa Dekabristov.

== Construction ==
Initial plans called for the station to open sometime from 2015 to 2016. In late 2010, the city pushed the opening date back to 2017. An initial assessment suggested that 42 buildings could be at risk from the construction. Consequently, the bid documents from the city required the construction company to shore up foundations for some of the buildings on the square.

Metrostroy, the lead construction company, began work on one of the tunnels from Spasskaya in February 2017. That tunnel was completed in December 2017.

In March 2018, work on the second tunnel hit a snag when workers walked off the job over unpaid wages. Workers reportedly had not been paid in three months. The construction company was unable to pay its workers when its accounts were frozen over accusations of unpaid taxes. With assistance from the Federal government, workers received their wages a week later.
