= Ploshchad Alexandra Nevskogo II (Saint Petersburg Metro) =

Saint Petersburg Metro Station

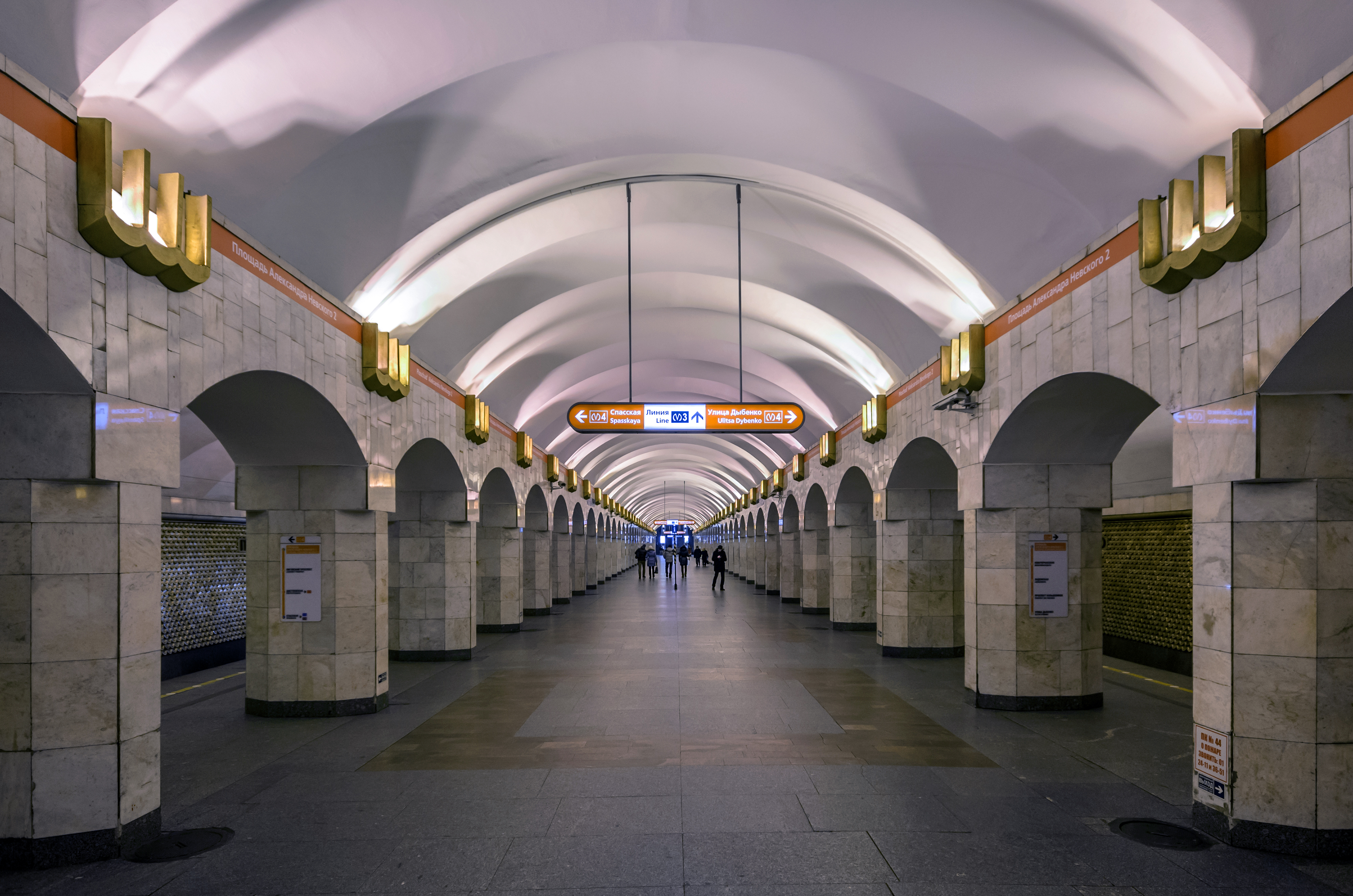
- Station Hall

General information
- Location: Tsentralny District; Saint Petersburg; Russia
- Coordinates: 59.923639°N 30.383333°E
- System: Saint Petersburg Metro station
- Operator: Saint Petersburg Metro
- Line: Pravoberezhnaya Line
- Platforms: 1 (Island platform)
- Tracks: 2

Construction
- Structure type: Underground
- Depth: ≈60 m (197 ft)

History
- Opened: December 30, 1985
- Electrified: Third rail

Services
Preceding station	Saint Petersburg Metro	Following station
Ligovsky Prospekt towards Gorny Institut	Line 4	Novocherkasskaya towards Ulitsa Dybenko
Mayakovskaya towards Begovaya	Line 3 transfer at Ploshchad Alexandra Nevskogo I	Yelizarovskaya towards Rybatskoye
Route map
Location

Ploshchad Alexandra Nevskogo II (Russian: Плóщадь Алексáндра Нéвского-2) is a station on the Line 4 of Saint Petersburg Metro, opened on December 30, 1985.

== Gallery ==
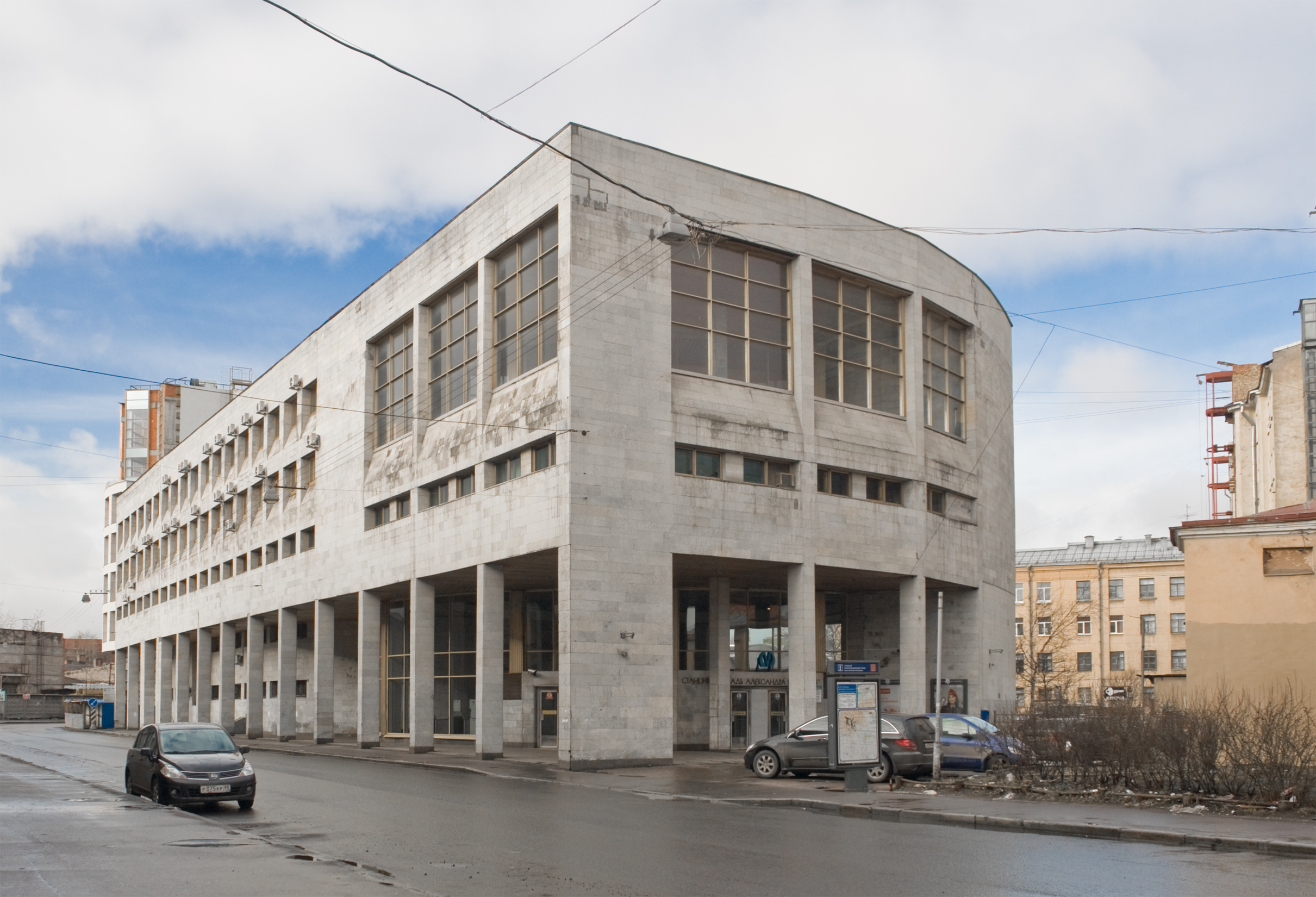
Alexander Nevsky Square-2 Station

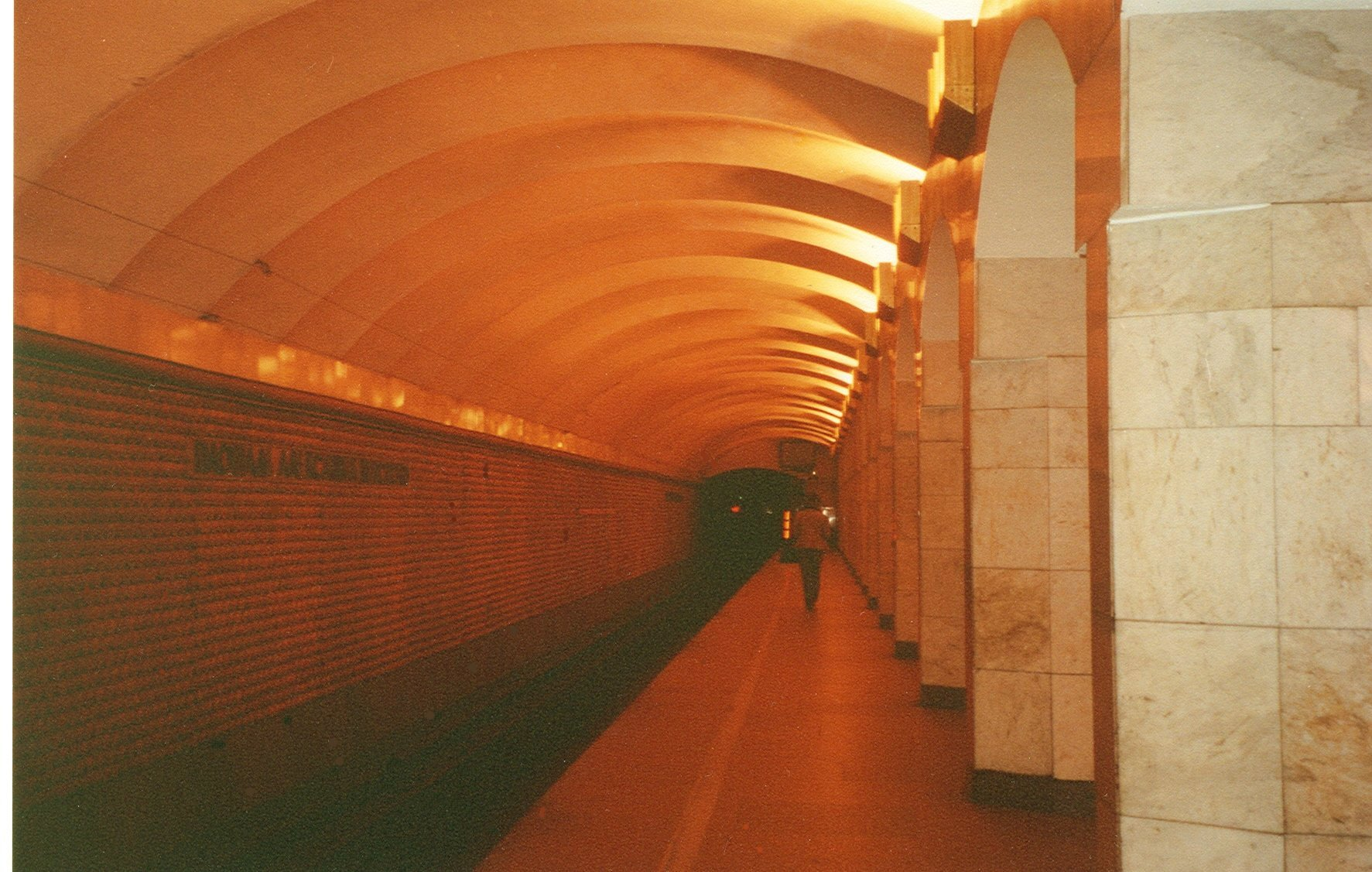

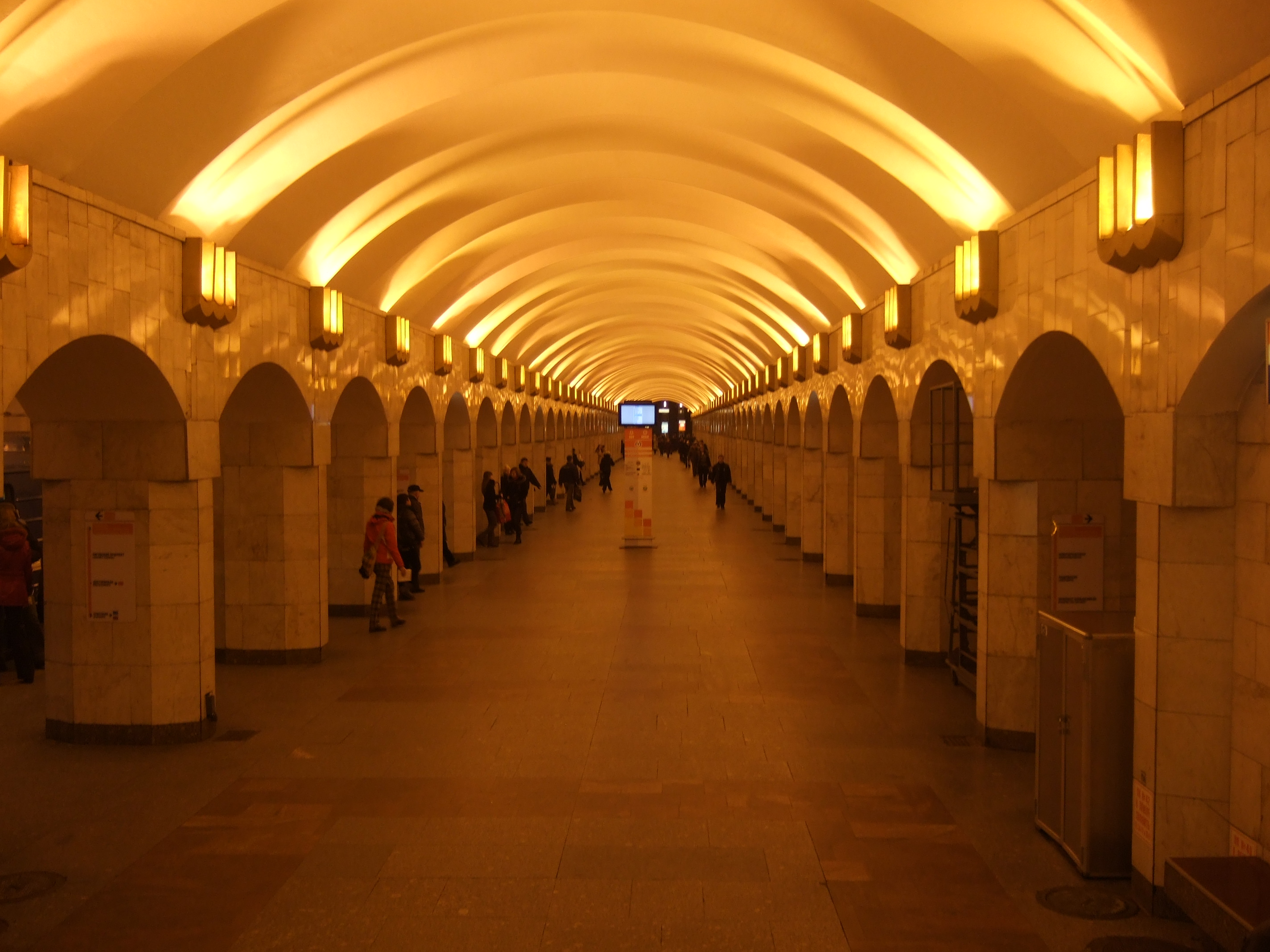

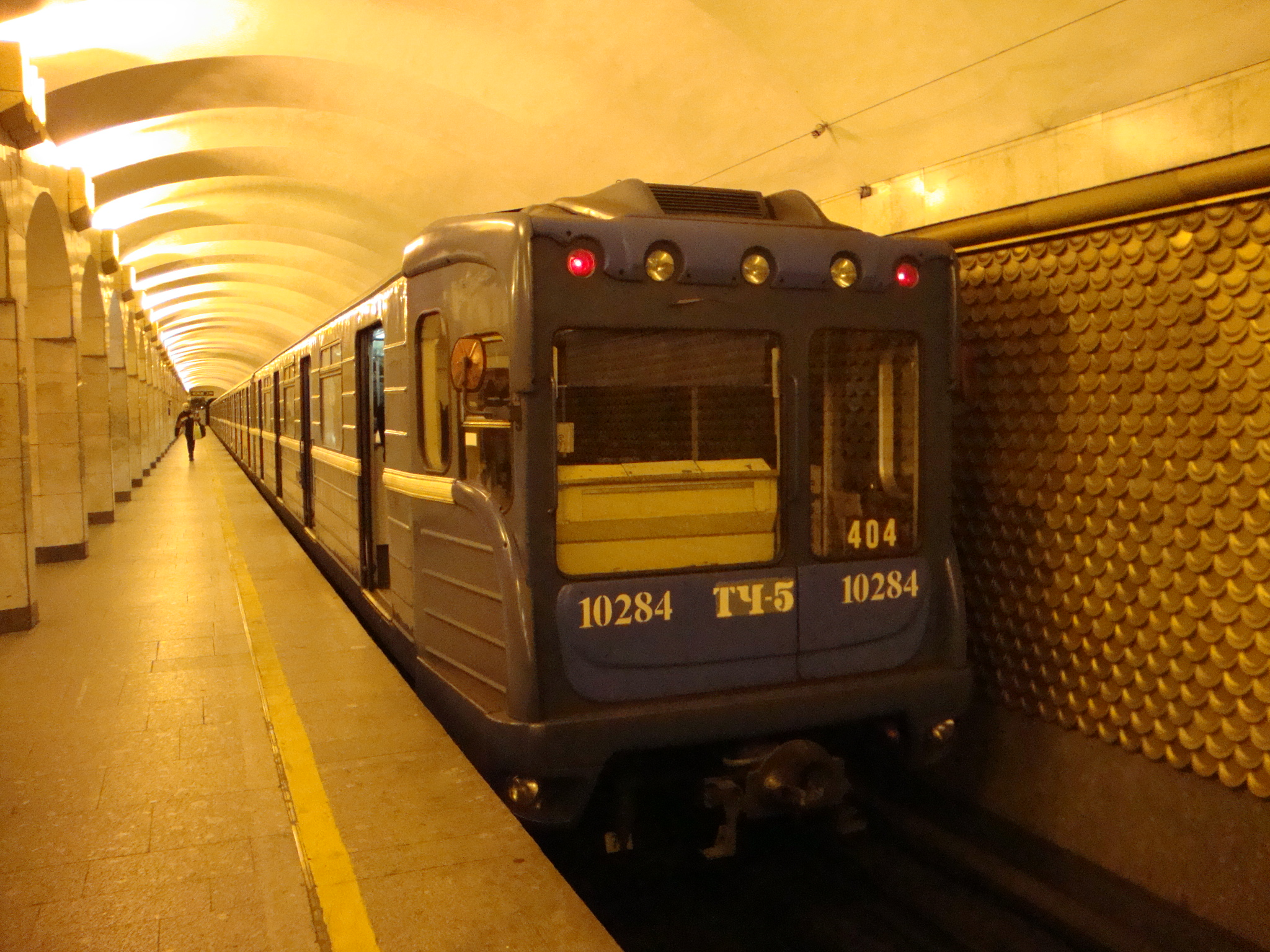

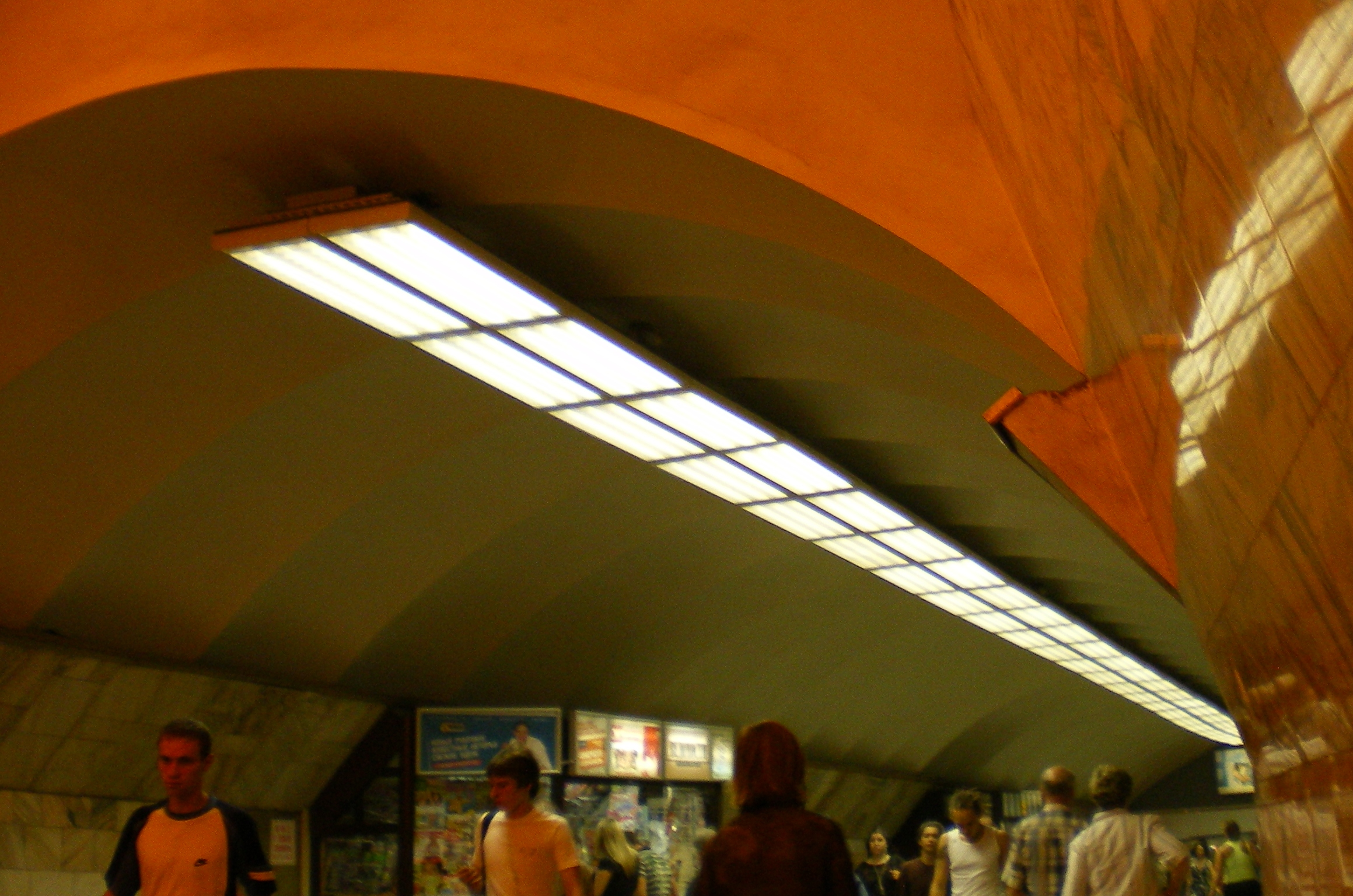
