= Ploshchad Alexandra Nevskogo (Saint Petersburg Metro) =

Ploshchad Alexandra Nevskogo (Saint Petersburg Metro) may refer to:

- Ploshchad Alexandra Nevskogo I (Saint Petersburg Metro), on Line 3 (Nevsko–Vasileostrovskaya Line)
- Ploshchad Alexandra Nevskogo II (Saint Petersburg Metro), on Line 4 (Pravoberezhnaya Line)
