= House of Culture of Railway Workers =

The House of Culture of Railway Workers was a building at No. 26 Ligovsky Avenue in Saint Petersburg, Russia. The building was originally the Orphanage for Poor Children of the Imperial Philanthropic Society, which had existed since 1816.

== History ==
In 1818, a Mr. F. M. Batasheva donated funds towards the purchase of a plot of land on what was then Ligovskaya Street. A two-storey stone house was built on the plot in 1828 by Anton Matveevich Kurtsi with a hipped roof and ten windows with lion masks. The building was rebuilt in 1852 by Vladislav Pavlovich Lvov, who also built a chapel in the grounds in 1853.

The buildings were renovated in 1858 by Evgeny Alekseevich Pirgov using funds from V. F. and I. F. Gromov. Pirgov connected the two existing buildings and constructed a carriage house.

In the Late 19th Century, 115 pupils attended the house, which at that time was run by a Mr. A. F. Lipsky. The buildings were transferred into ownership by the railways in 1905 for plans to build a railway station expansion. Demolition did not occur, with the building being converted into a residential building after the October Revolution of 1917. This continued until the Mid 1940s when the House of Culture of Railway Workers opened.

=== Demolition ===
The buildings were demolished in 1996 and is now the Galeria Shopping Mall.

== Church of St. Nicanor the Apostle ==
The Church of St. Nicanor the Apostle was built in 1853 by Vladislav Pavlovich Lvov using funds from the House of Charity's benefactors.
