= K. E. Egorov =

Russian architect (1814-1878)

- Born: Konstantin Egorovich Egorov; 1814
- Died: December 12, 1878 (aged 63–64)
- Education: Imperial Academy of Arts
- Occupation: Architect
- Awards: Free Artist

Konstantin Egorovich Egorov (1814–1878) was a Russian architect and academician of the Imperial Academy of Arts. He was a collegiate registrar, and in 1842, he received the title of Free Artist from the Imperial Academy of Arts for his design of the Commercial Baths. In 1852, he was appointed an Academician for his designs of a military hospital. He operated in Saint Petersburg, Russia in the Mid 19th Century.

== Buildings ==
- Apartment building of A. I Alexandrovna, 5 Suvorovsky Avenue, Saint Petersburg, 1837
- 4 Nikolskaya Square, Saint Petersburg, 1839
- Apartment building of A. A. Timofeeva, 8 Kuznechny Lane, Saint Petersburg, 1840
- 142 Griboyedov Canal Embankment, Saint Petersburg, 1845
- Apartment building of M. S. Tatishcheva, 6 Preobrazhenskaya Square, Saint Petersburg, 1852
- Apartment building of the St. Petersburg Insurance Society, 25 Ligovsky Avenue, Saint Petersburg, 1854
- A. Morgan's Mansion, 23 Sovetskaya Street, Saint Petersburg, 1859
- Apartment building of K. Koch, 88 Bolshoy Avenue, Saint Petersburg, 1865-1866
- 25 Serpukhovskaya Street, Saint Petersburg, 1874
- Church of St. Nicholas, Ilyeshi, Volosovsky District, Leningrad Oblast, 1854-1864, along with Karl Ivanovich Brandt.
