= 35 Ligovsky Avenue =

Building in Saint Petersburg, Russia

35 Ligovsky Avenue is a building in Saint Petersburg, Russia. The building was built in 1897–1898 by Otto Ludvigovoch Ignatovich in Eclectic style to replace a previous Early 19th Century building.

The plot was owned by the Dmitrievs in the 1870s, and by 1888, the building was owned by Abram Grigorevich Haimovich, followed by Abram Genoch and Aron Abramovich Kaplun in 1896. The Kapluns owned the buildings until 1910. Pyotr Fedorovich Morozov became the new owner in 1912-1917. Morozov founded a hotel in 1924 at the building called "Versailles", along with D. M. Fedorova and N. K. Mamontov. The hotel became the "Danube" in 1928.

There was a confectionary factory in the buildings called S. Vasiliev. The factory was founded in 1875 and was owned by A. Kaplun and Son, and held 70 employees in 1901, and 160 in 1903.

A chocolate factory was founded in the buildings in 1912 called "Mignon".
