= Apartment building of the St. Petersburg Insurance Society =

The Apartment building of the St. Petersburg Insurance Society is located at 25 Ligovsky Avenue in Saint Petersburg, Russia.

The building was built in 1854 by Konstantin Egorovich Egorov, and rebuilt in 1856 by Pyotr Konstantinovich Sverchkov in Eclectic style.

The architect, A. K. Bruni, examined the building in 1865 noted "the strength of a stone four storey corner house, elevated from the side of the courtyard by the fifth floor and divided into apartments, with a two-storey courtyard wings and one storey wooden services." The building cost 150 thousand rubles, according to Bruni, which was later confirmed by the architect.

The owner of the building in 1895 was Alexander Prussak. The building was acquired by Vera Sergeevna Denisyeva in 1898, and was immediately sold to the St. Petersburg Insurance Society who rebuilt the house, which was later damaged by fire in 1913.

A small fire occurred in the top floor of the building in 2013.

== Notable residents ==
Architect, Pyotr Lukich Villiers and historian E. I. Lovyagin lived in the house in the 1860s, when the address was 8 Gusev Lane.

Between Late 1873 and May 1874, Fyodor Dostoevsky lived in apartment No. 17 on the Second floor of this building. He rented the apartment due to its proximity to his workplace, the Grazhdanin magazine offices. Dostoevsky mentioned the apartment in a letter to Anna Dostoevskaya, while she was in Staraya Russa.

Writer, Dmitry Mamin-Sibiryak lived here between 1893 and 1896.

The artist, Aleksandr Morozov lived in the building between 1897 and 1898.

Civil engineer, P. Y. Porubinovsky lived here between 1903 and 1904.

Member of the State Duma, Major General Aleksandr Aleksandrovich Mozhaisky, lived here with his daughter Lyubov in 1917.
