= Kopeikin Button Factory =

- Built: 1877
- Location: 42 Ligovsky Avenue; Saint Petersburg, Russia
- Industry: Buttons
- Owner: Avksentiy Ignatyevich Kopeikin
- Defunct: 1917

The Kopeikin Button Factory was a Button factory in Saint Petersburg, Russia.

The factory was built in 1877–1879 by Aleksandr Ivanovich Polikarpov, who rebuilt the outbuildings in 1888 and 1896. The owner of the factory was Avksentiy Ignatyevich Kopeikin, since he purchased the land in 1889 from Zimina, following the 1866 division of the Plot No. 30 of the Ligovsky Canal Embankment.

The Kopeikin family came from peasants and Serfs in Panino, Romanovo-Borisoglebsky Uyezd, Yaroslavl Oblast. The family opened an earlier button factory in St. Petersburg in 1840, which employed over 50 people, with a 100 thousand ruble a year turnover.

The factory produced officer's buttons and stamped metal items for uniforms. They also produced badges, insignia, coat of arms and stamps. A restaurant was also housed in the site called "Belle-Vue", which was renovated in 1910 and re opened as a hall for banquets with new furniture and Russian and European cuisines. The restaurant also had an exclusive selection of French wines.

In Late 1917 the factory was confiscated from the Kopeikins and transferred to the railway company who opened the Prosveshchenie Theatre in the former factory buildings. The buildings were later converted to a lecture hall in Autumn 1924.

The former factory buildings were demolished in 1996 for the planned construction of the Saint Petersburg–Moscow railway, which didn't happen. The site is now the Galeria (Saint Petersburg).

== Gabay and Michri Tobacco Factory ==
In 1862, there was a tobacco, cigar and cigarette factory of M. Solova, with an output of 1,100 items. In 1867, the factory employed 21 men and 18 women, with a turnover of 130 thousand Ruble. The 1867 Merchant Book lists Samuel Gabay as 41 years old, of Kharkiv, and in the Merchant Class since 1861. He also ran a tobacco shop in the Moskovsky District, Saint Petersburg, in Loginov's House, and in the Tuttolmina's House in the Admiralteysky District. The book also lists Avraam Michri as 30 years old, of Sevastopol, and a merchant since 1861. The tobacco factory received an award from the 1862 International Exhibition.

== Eldorado Concert Hall ==
The Eldorado Concert Hall opened on December 11, 1912 under the management of M. Kh. Jacobs-Yakubovich. The entry fee was 60 kopeks and 1 ruble. The hall was "the liveliest, most central, cheerful corner of St. Petersburg". Some artists who performed at the hall included Aleksander Orlov and Negro Williams.
