= Galeria (Saint Petersburg) =

Shopping mall in Saint Petersburg, Russia

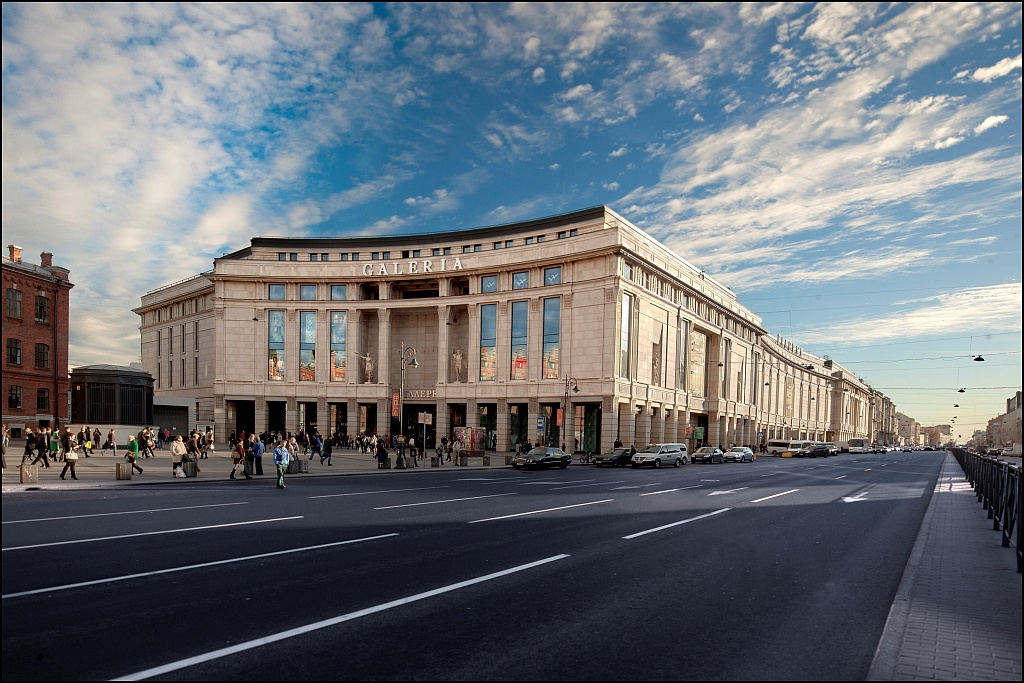
- Location: 26-38 Ligovsky, St Petersburg, Russia
- Coordinates: 59.928°N 30.361°E
- Opened: November 25, 2010
- Num. of stores: Over 300
- Parking: Underground garage, 1200 cars
- Website: galeria.spb.ru/en

Galeria shopping and entertainment center is located in the center of St Petersburg, Russia, at the juncture of two of the city's major avenues - Nevsky and Ligovsky Prospekt.

Galeria opened on November 25, 2010, and resulted in the demolition of Nos. 24, 26, 30, 34-36, 38 and 42 Ligovsky Avenue. There are more than 300 shops, 28 restaurants and cafes and 10 cinema screens (including IMAX) in the five-floor center. There is underground parking with a capacity for 1200 cars and additional bicycle parking.

Galeria has a variety of stores selling clothes, accessories, sports equipment, footwear, and gifts. Available brands include H&M, Zara, Reserved and luxury brands such as Pinko, Falconeri, Karen Millen, Lagerfeld, Michael Kors, DKNY, Armani, Marco Polo, Hugo Boss, Max Mara Weekend, Stefanel.

== Incidents ==
According to Russian newspapers, a terrorist attack on the shopping mall was prevented by the Federal Security Service (FSB) in November 2016.

== Previous buildings on the site ==
The previous buildings on the site were demolished in 1996 for the construction of the Saint Petersburg–Moscow railway, which didn't happen.

• No. 24 - Church of St. Nicanor the Apostle

• No. 26 - House of Culture of Railway Workers

• No. 30 - The building was owned by Maria Stepanovna Samsonova in the 1890s, who resided at 63 Gorokhovaya Street. In 1914-1917, the building was owned by Alexei and Peter Fedorovich Morozov and Semyon Kornilovoch Pechersky.

• No. 34 - The building was built in 1851-1853 by Anikin Evgeny Evgrafovich. The building was owned by Anna Gerasimovna Ramenskikh and Nadezhda Ivanovna and Nikolay Artemyevich Riznikovs.

• No. 36 - Krasnogorsky House. Built in 1852 by Evgeny Petrovich Dmitrevsky. Extended in 1858 by Ferdinand Loginovich Miller. The house belonged to Ivan Alexandrovich Krasnogorsky in 1894, later belonging to Varvara Mikhailovna Krasnogorskaya in 1896.

• No. 38 - The building was built in 1862 by Alexey Andreev for S. E. Efimov. The façade was rebuilt in 1869 by Vasily von Hecker. The building was extended in 1876 by Aleksandr Karlovich Treder. The owner of the house in 1894 was Ivan Ivanovich Kondratiev, who owned the house until 1916, when the building was owned by Vyacheslav Vyacheslavovich Kubovets. The building was a kindergarten during Soviet times.

• No. 42 - Kopeikin Button Factory and Gabay and Michri Tobacco Factory
