= Spasskaya (Saint Petersburg Metro) =

Saint Petersburg Metro Station

Spasskaya Спасская
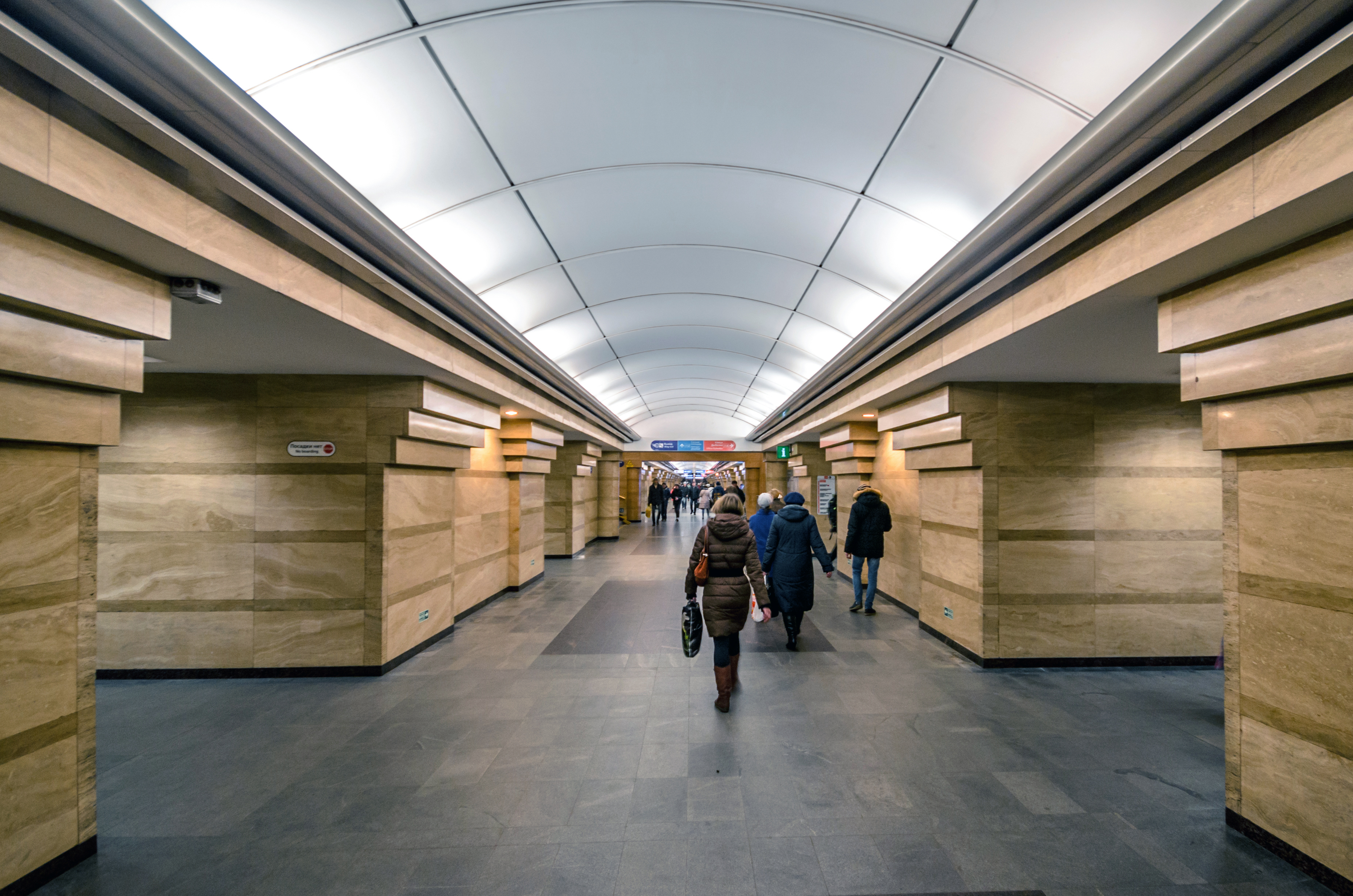
- Station Hall

General information
- Location: Admiralteysky District; Saint Petersburg; Russia
- Coordinates: 59.926744°N 30.319547°E
- System: Saint Petersburg Metro station
- Line: Pravoberezhnaya Line
- Platforms: 02
- Tracks: 02

Construction
- Structure type: Underground
- Depth: ≈61 m (200 ft)
- Platform levels: 03
- Parking: No
- Cycle facilities: No

History
- Opened: March 7, 2009
- Electrified: Third rail

Services
Preceding station	Saint Petersburg Metro	Following station
Gorny Institut Terminus	Line 4	Dostoyevskaya towards Ulitsa Dybenko
Nevsky Prospekt towards Parnas	Line 2 transfer at Sennaya Ploshchad	Tekhnologichesky Institut towards Kupchino
Admiralteyskaya towards Komendantsky Prospekt	Line 5 transfer at Sadovaya	Zvenigorodskaya towards Shushary
Route map
Location

Spasskaya (Russian: Спáсская) is a station of the Line 4 of the Saint Petersburg Metro. It is part of the first three-way transfer station that also includes Sadovaya and Sennaya Ploshchad stations. The station was originally scheduled to open in December 2008, but eventually opened on March 7, 2009 because of last-minute repairs to station's transfer escalators.

Until 27 December 2024, Spasskaya was the western terminus of the line. On that day, one-station extension to Gorny Institut was opened. Teatralnaya station is located between Spasskaya and Gorny Institut, however, the exits of that station have not yet been built, and the station is planned for opening in 2027.

== Gallery ==
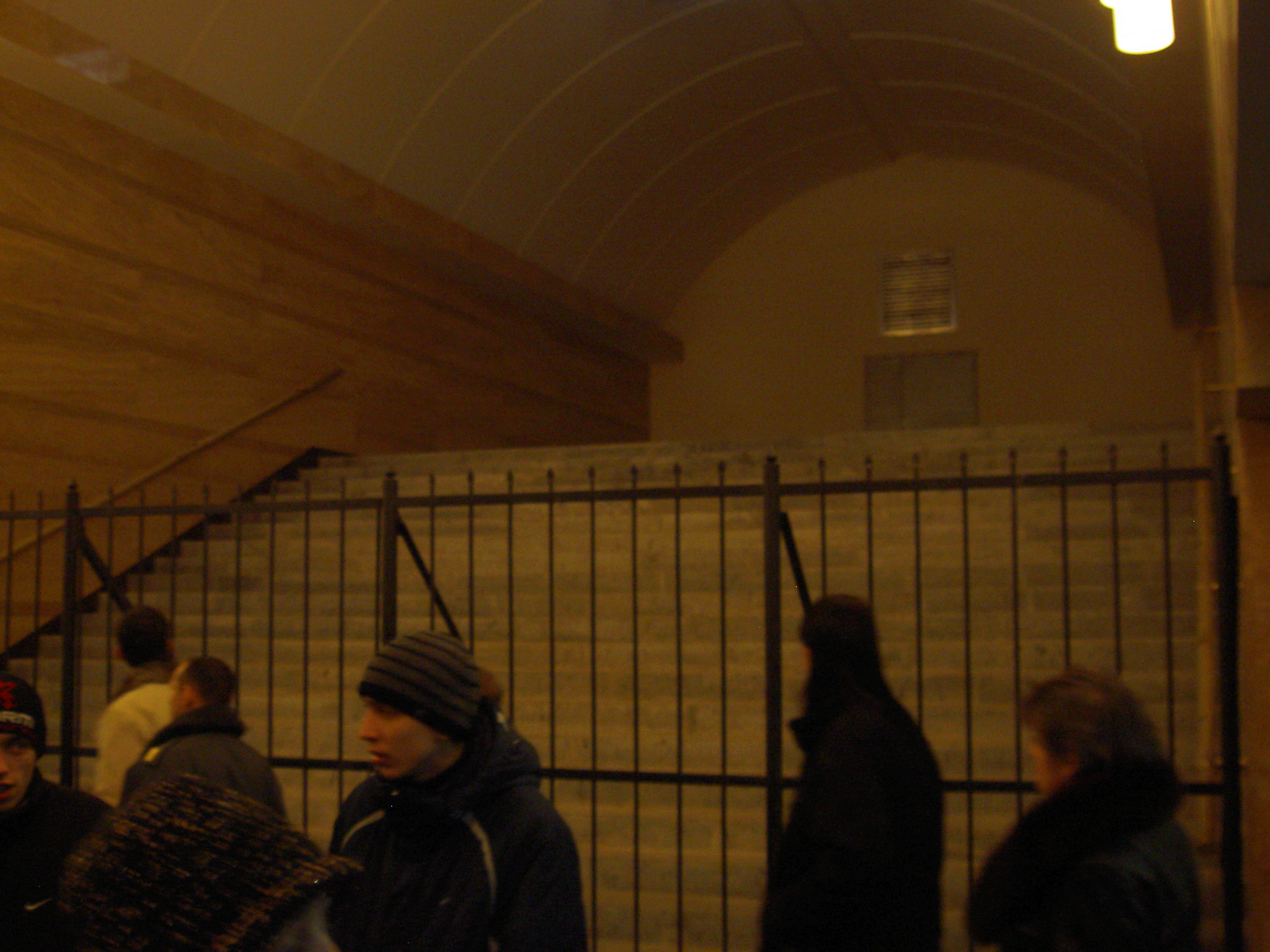
Location of the future exit

== See also ==
- Saviour Church on Sennaya Square - demolished church from which the station takes its name
