= A Stop in a Desert =

1965 book by Joseph Brodsky

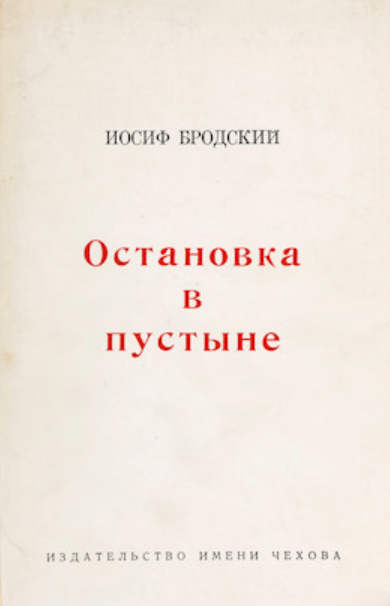
- Author: Joseph Brodsky
- Original title: Остановка в пустыне
- Language: Russian
- Genre: Poetry
- Published: 1965
- Publisher: Chekhov Publishing House of the East European Fund, Inc.
- Publication place: United States

A Stop in a Desert (Russian: Остановка в пустыне) is the second book of poems of Joseph Brodsky and the first composed by the poet himself. It is considered the result of the early works of the poet.

Since 1965, Joseph Brodsky lived in Leningrad. At this time, only occasionally he managed to publish something of his poems in the Soviet press, his poems printed in emigrant magazines, and the first book of his poems published in 1965 in the United States, entitled "Poems and Poems". It was drawn up without the participation of the author.

A Stop in a Desert is the first book of poems Brodsky, composed by himself. Brodsky was a collection of the USSR, and the texts of the poems were secretly transferred to the United States. The book was published in 1970 by Chekhov Publishing House. In 1988, the publishing house "Ardis" second edition of the collection has been carried out.
