= Line 4 (Saint Petersburg Metro) =

Line 4 (Lakhtinsko-Pravoberezhnaya)

Overview
- Status: Operational
- Owner: Saint Petersburg Metro
- Termini: Gorny Institut; Ulitsa Dybenko
- Stations: 9

Service
- Type: Rapid transit
- System: Saint Petersburg Metro

History
- Opened: 30 December 1985; 40 years ago
- Last extension: 2024

Technical
- Line length: 16 km (9.9 mi)
- Track gauge: 1,524 mm (5 ft)

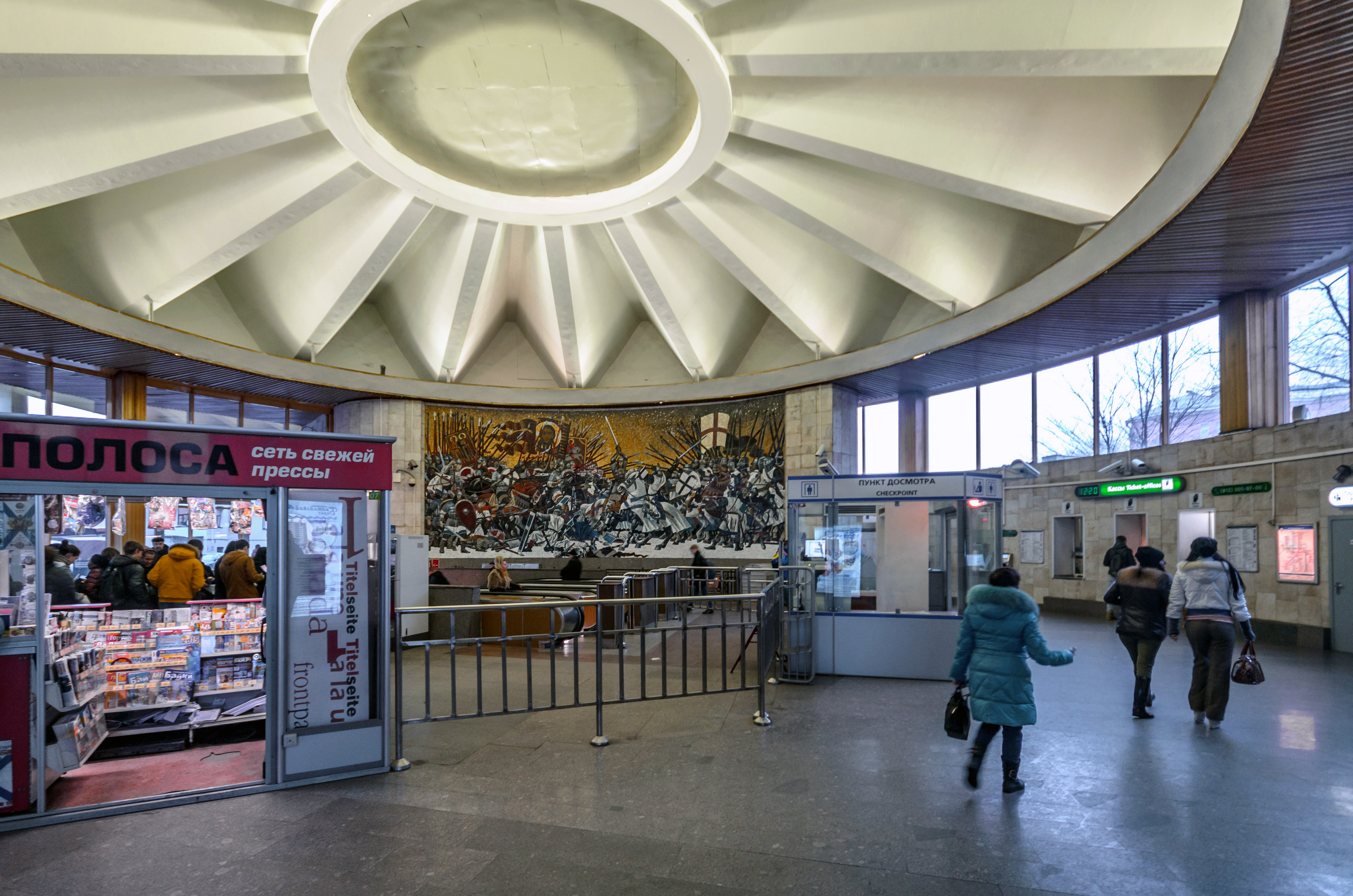
Ploshchad Alexandra Nevskogo II

Line 4 of the Saint Petersburg Metro, also known as Lakhtinsko-Pravoberezhnaya Line (Russian: Ла́хтинско-Правобере́жная) or Orange Line, is a rapid transit line in Saint Petersburg, Russia, which connects city centre with the south-east districts on the right bank of the Neva River. Despite its name, which literally means Lakhta–Right Bank Line, the line from its opening date had the stations on the left bank of the Neva River. Moreover, currently the line does not have any stations near the Lakhta area. Opened in 1985, it is the shortest line in the system with the stations featuring a modern design. Since 1994, it has been officially designated "Line 4," but the original name is still often used in informal context.

The line originally opened to provide access from the centre for the new residential areas in the eastern part of city, along the right bank of the Neva. However, delays in the construction of the future Line 5, compelled the metro officials to temporarily link the already completed northern part of the Line 5 (starting from Sadovaya) to Line 4, as they felt that it was better to have a single connected line rather than two unconnected ones. From that point on, the line expanded northward, as per original plans of Line 5 expansion.

On March 7, 2009, Spasskaya station was completed, creating the city's first three-way transfer and it officially became the new terminal for Line 4. As per the original plan, all Line 4 stations north of Dostoyevskaya were absorbed into the recently opened Line 5.

Until 27 December 2024, Spasskaya was the western terminus of the line. On that day, one-station extension to Gorny Institut was opened. Teatralnaya station is located between Spasskaya and Gorny Institut, however, the exits of that station have not yet been built, and the station is planned for opening in 2027.

== Timeline ==
Segment	Date opened	Length
Ploshchad Alexandra Nevskogo to Prospekt Bolshevikov	December 30, 1985	5.2 km
Prospekt Bolshevikov to Ulitsa Dybenko	November 1, 1987	1.7 km
Ploshchad Alexandra Nevskogo to Sadovaya	December 30, 1991	4.2 km
Sadovaya to Chkalovskaya (now Line 5)	September 15, 1997	4.4 km
Chkalovskaya to Staraya Derevnya (now Line 5)	January 15, 1999	4.1 km
Krestovsky Ostrov	September 3, 1999	N/A
Staraya Derevnya to Komendantsky Prospekt (now Line 5)	April 2, 2005	2.3 km
Spasskaya	March 7, 2009	-10.8 km
Gorny Institut	December 27, 2024	3,6 km*
Total:	9 Stations	16 km

* Segment from Sadovaya to Komendantsky Prospekt has been transferred to Line 5. Spasskaya has become the interchange station to Line 5 at Sadovaya.

== Name changes ==
Station	Previous name(s)	Years
Novocherkasskaya	Krasnogvardeiskaya	1985–1991

== Transfers ==
Transfer to	At
Line 1 (Saint Petersburg Metro)	Dostoyevskaya
Line 2 (Saint Petersburg Metro)	Spasskaya
Line 3 (Saint Petersburg Metro)	Ploshchad Alexandra Nevskogo II
Line 5 (Saint Petersburg Metro)	Spasskaya

== Rolling stock ==
The line is served by the Vyborgskoe (No. 6) depot, and has 42 six-carriage trains assigned to it. Some of them are 81-717/714 trains from the 1980s, while others are the 81-540.2/541.2, .5, and .8 modifications from the 2000s.

== Recent developments and future plans ==
=== Planned stations ===
- Beyond Ulitsa Dybenko:
  - Kudrovo
