= Gorny Institut (Saint Petersburg Metro) =

Saint Petersburg Metro Station

Gorny Institut Горный институт
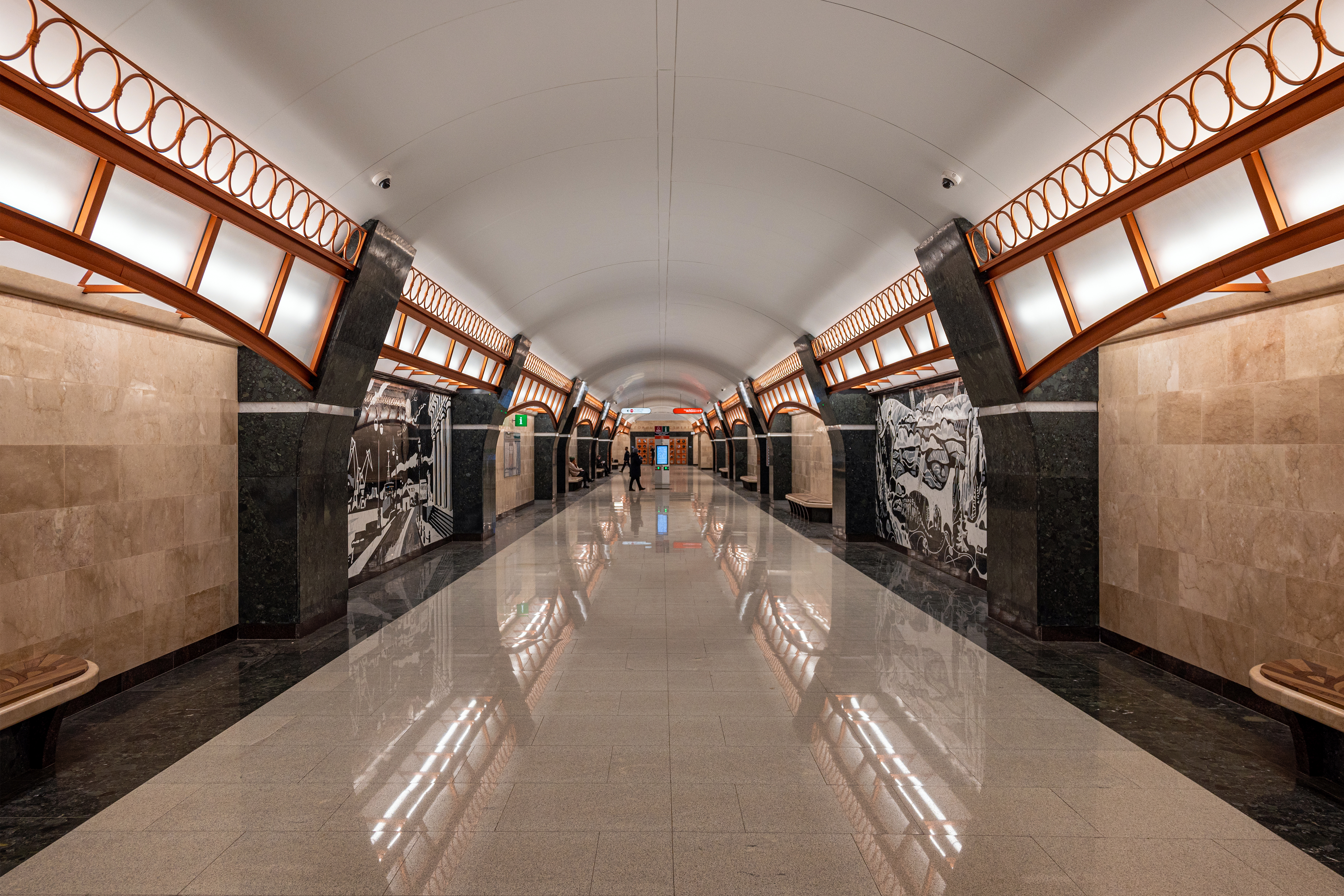

General information
- Location: Vasileostrovsky District; Saint Petersburg; Russia
- Coordinates: 59.93156°N 30.26301°E
- System: Saint Petersburg Metro station
- Line: Pravoberezhnaya Line

Construction
- Structure type: Underground

History
- Opened: 27 December 2024
- Electrified: Third rail

Services
Preceding station	Saint Petersburg Metro	Following station
Terminus	Line 4	Spasskaya towards Ulitsa Dybenko
Route map
Location

Gorny Institut (Russian: Горный институт) is the station of Saint Petersburg Metro. It is the western terminus of Line 4. The station was opened on 27 December 2024 as a one-station extension from Spasskaya and became the first metro station opened in Saint Petersburg in five years.

The opening of the station was originally planned for 2018 but it was postponed several times. Teatralnaya station is located between Spasskaya and Gorny Institut, however, the exits of that station have not yet been built, and the station is planned for opening in 2027.

The station is located in Municipal Okrug 7 of Vasileostrovsky District, at the crossing of Bolshoy Avenue of Vasilyevsky Island and 24—25 Lines of Vasilyevsky Island, next to Saint Petersburg Mining University (hence the name, which means "Mining Institute" in Russian).
