= Ulitsa Dybenko (Saint Petersburg Metro) =

Saint Petersburg Metro Station

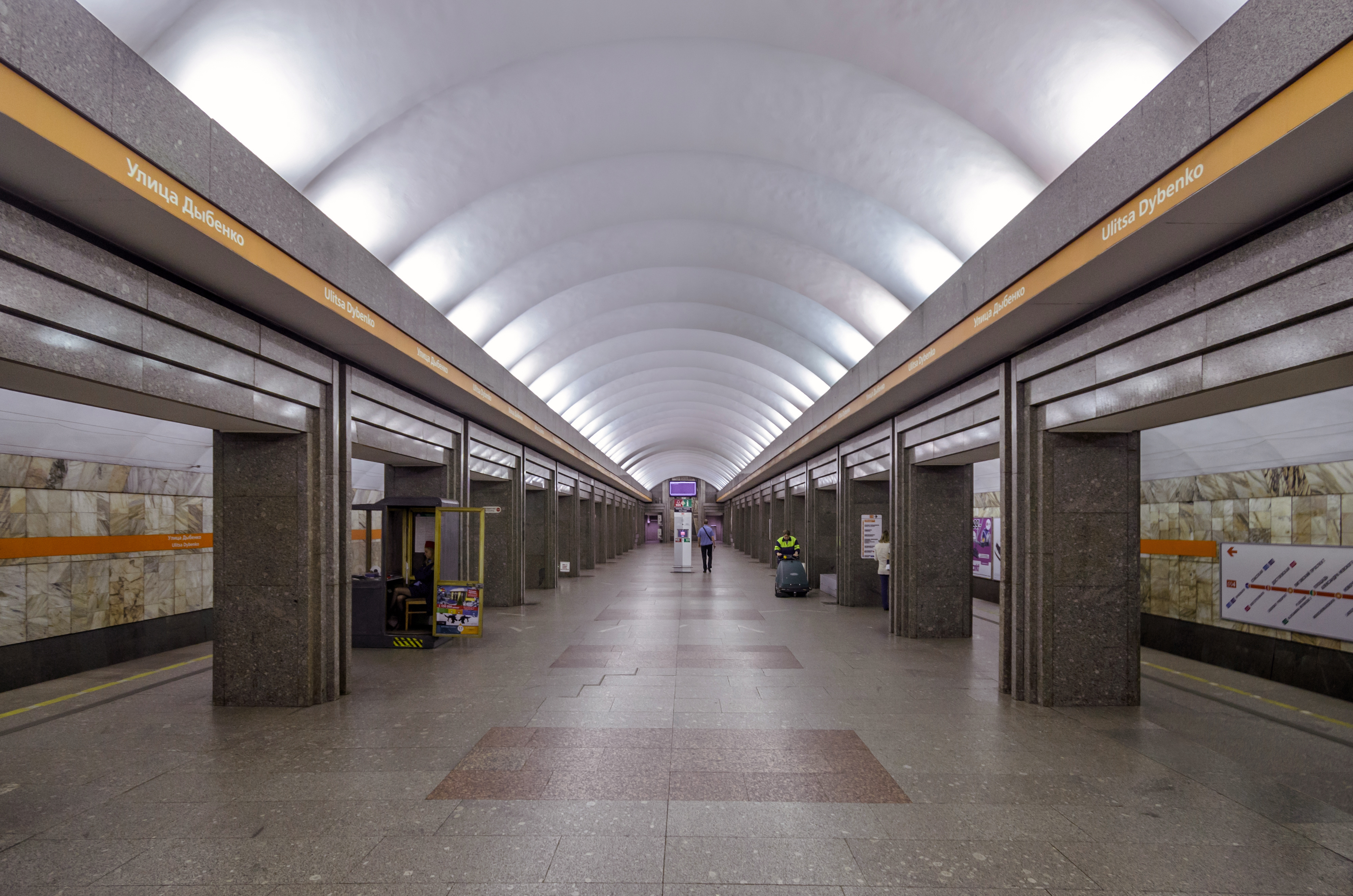

General information
- Location: 22/26, Dybenko street, Nevsky District; Saint Petersburg; Russia
- Coordinates: 59.907444°N 30.483356°E
- System: Saint Petersburg Metro station
- Line: Pravoberezhnaya Line
- Platforms: 1 (Island platform)
- Tracks: 2

Construction
- Structure type: Underground
- Depth: ≈63 m (207 ft)

History
- Opened: October 1, 1987
- Electrified: Third rail

Services
Preceding station	Saint Petersburg Metro	Following station
Prospekt Bolshevikov towards Gorny Institut	Line 4	Terminus
Route map
Location

Ulitsa Dybenko (Russian: У́лица Дыбéнко), meaning "Dybenko street", is the terminus station of Line 4 of Saint Petersburg Metro, opened on October 1, 1987. It is the current terminus of the Pravoberezhnaya line of St. Petersburg metro (Line 4, the orange line), until the construction of the Kudrovo metro station is finished in 2028. The station is located in the eastern part of the city, on the right bank of the Neva River, at the intersection of Prospect Bolshevikov and Dybenko Street.

The Dybenko Street metro station is the only one in Saint-Petersburg whose name mentions the street, "Dybenko street", itself named after Pavel Dybenko, a Ukrainian Bolshevik revolutionary and a leading Soviet officer and military commander, like many other streets of the Nevsky District that were named in association with the history of the revolutionary movement in Russia.

The decoration of the station is also related to revolutionary struggle, most notably a mosaic at the end of the platform, depicting of a woman holding a rifle with her left hand a sign in Russian in her right hand that reads “Freedom. Peace. The brotherhood. Equality. Labor.” Six other mosaic panels are distributed in the columns between platforms, depicting banners, flames, the hammer and the sickle, wheat and bayonets, common imagery of Soviet Russia.

The station has a ground-based lobby in the form of a quadrangle with a high granite portal, arranged on the cut corner, which is oriented to the junction. The lobby was made by architects VG Khil'chenko and KG Leont'yev. Unlike other Saint Petersburg metro stations, the lobby of Ulitsa Dybenko is "designed without panoramic glazing, without windows and doors. Which is logical for a ground-based anti-nuclear defense system." The station's depth is 63 meters and has a total traffic of 1576 persons per month.

== Transport ==
Buses: 4, 97, 140, 191, 228, 233, 234, 255A, 255Б, 264, 285, 288, 469, 469A, 485, 492A, 511, 565, 575, 579, 596Б, 692, 692A, 860, 860Л, 865, 879Д, 895. Trolleybuses: 14, 27, 28, 43. Trams: 7, 7A, 23, A. Minibus: 491, 492 (Staraya), 492 (Zh K Tsentralniy), 572A, 596A (po Stroiteley), 596A (po Yevropeyskomu), K-801.
