= Pushkinskaya (Saint Petersburg Metro) =

Saint Petersburg Metro Station

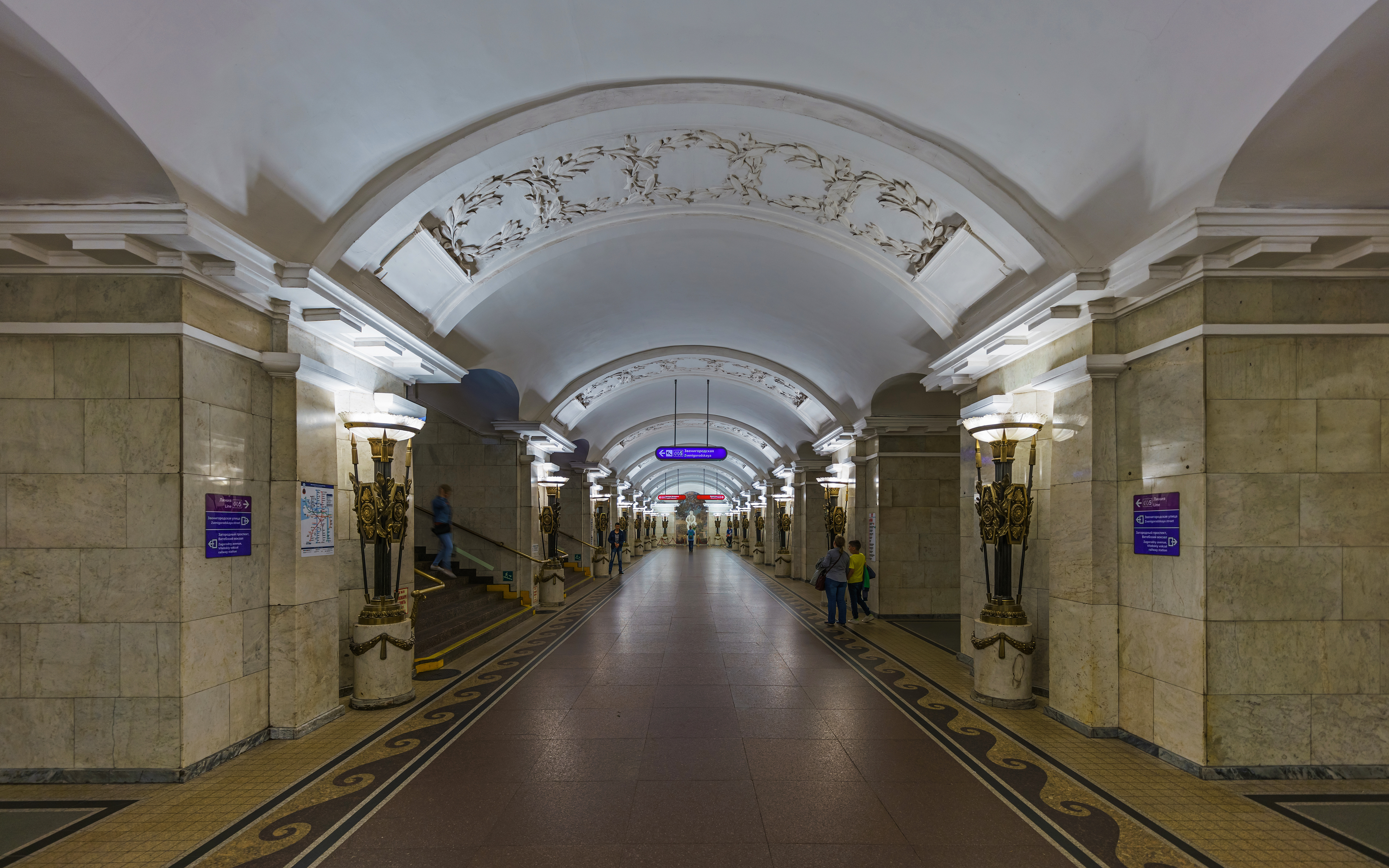
- Station Hall

General information
- Location: Admiralteysky District; Saint Petersburg; Russia
- Coordinates: 59°55′14.48″N 30°19′46.81″E
- System: Saint Petersburg Metro station
- Operator: Saint Petersburg Metro
- Line: Kirovsko–Vyborgskaya Line
- Platforms: 1 (Island platform)
- Tracks: 2

Construction
- Structure type: Underground
- Depth: ≈57 m (187 ft)

History
- Opened: 30 April 1956
- Electrified: Third rail

Services
| Preceding station | Saint Petersburg Metro | Following station |
|---|---|---|
| Vladimirskaya towards Devyatkino | Line 1 | Tekhnologichesky Institut towards Prospekt Veteranov |
| Sadovaya towards Komendantsky Prospekt | Line 5 transfer at Zvenigorodskaya | Obvodny Kanal towards Shushary |
Route map
Location

Pushkinskaya (Russian: Пу́шкинская) is a station of the Saint Petersburg Metro. It first opened on 30 April 1956, under the original name of "Vitebskiy vokzal", referring to the connecting Vitebsky railway station.

There is a monument in the station dedicated to the poet Alexander Pushkin sculpted by Mikhail Anikushin. This station was the first USSR metro station with memorial located under the ground.
