= Volkovo =

Volkovo may refer to:

North Macedonia

- Volkovo, Gjorče Petrov
- Volkovo, Prilep

Russia

- Volkovo, Russia, several rural localities in Russia
- Volkovo Cemetery, the largest and oldest non-Orthodox cemetery in St. Petersburg, Russia

== See also ==
- Volkov (disambiguation)
- Volkovsky (disambiguation)
