= Sportivnaya (Saint Petersburg Metro) =

Saint Petersburg Metro Station

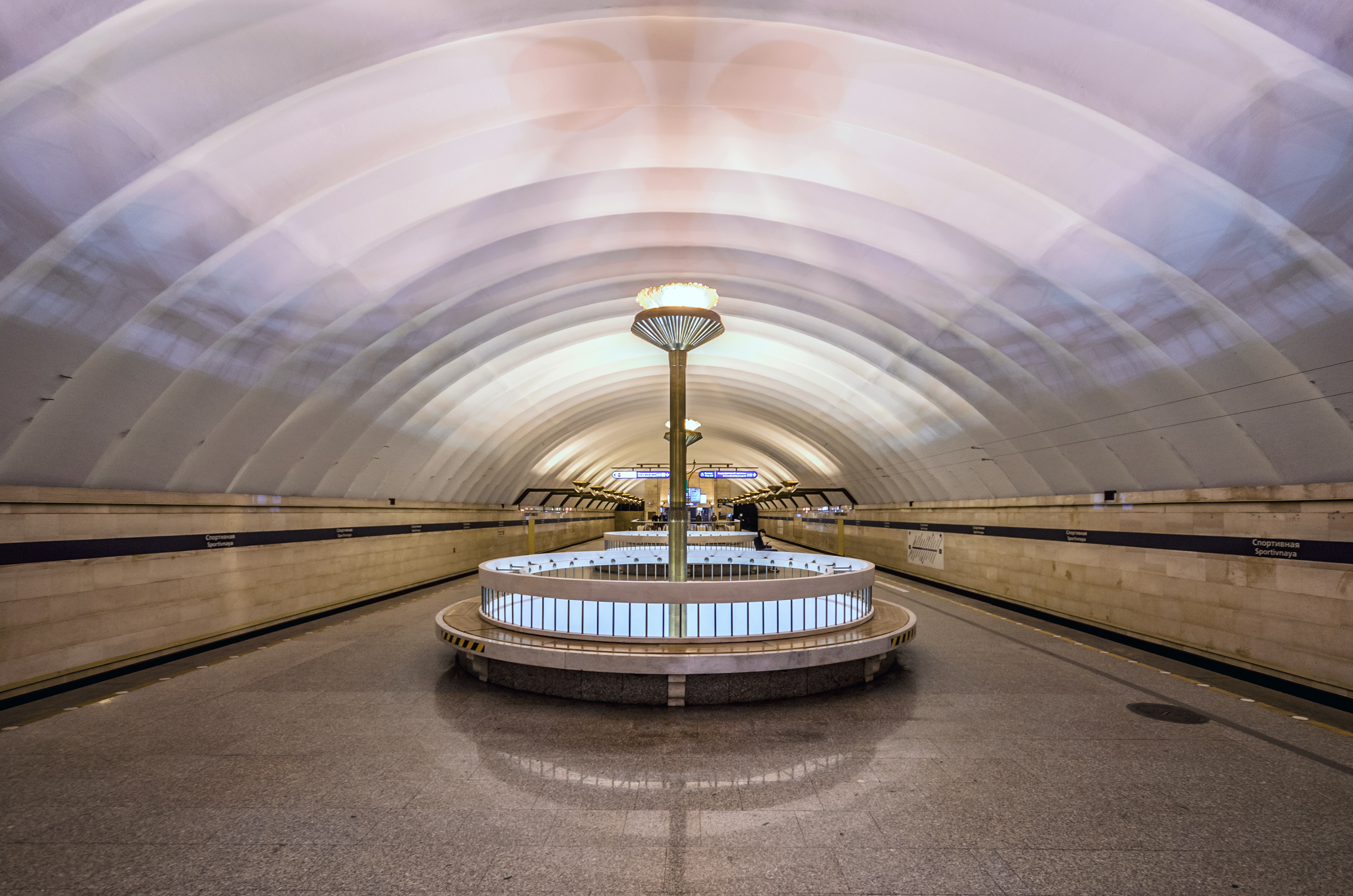
- Upper level

General information
- Location: 20 corp.1, Prospect of Dobrolyubov, Petrogradsky District (old entrance); 58, Vasileostrovsky District (new entrance); Saint Petersburg; Russia
- Coordinates: 59.952083°N 30.290611°E
- System: Saint Petersburg Metro station
- Operator: Saint Petersburg Metro
- Line: Frunzensko-Primorskaya Line
- Platforms: 2 island platforms
- Tracks: 4 (At the moment only 2 are working)

Construction
- Structure type: Underground
- Depth: ≈64 metres (210 ft)
- Platform levels: 2
- Parking: No
- Cycle facilities: Yes

History
- Opened: 15 September 1997
- Electrified: 825 V DC low third rail

Services
| Preceding station | Saint Petersburg Metro | Following station |
|---|---|---|
| Chkalovskaya towards Komendantsky Prospekt | Line 5 | Admiralteyskaya towards Shushary |
Route map
Location

Sportivnaya (Russian: Спорти́вная) (literally - Sportage) is a station on the Frunzensko-Primorskaya Line of the Saint Petersburg Metro. The station was designed by Alexander Konstantinov, Alexander Bystrov and Andrey Larionov. It opened on 15 September 1997 as part of the Pravoberezhnaya Line. Sportivnaya is the only two-level single-vault transfer metro station outside Washington D.C. The floors are connected by two groups of escalators, one of which only started being in regular operation with the opening of the exit to Vasilyevsky island. The lower floor serves the southbound trains while the upper floor serves the northbound ones. The upper floor is linked to the station's exit to south-eastern side of Petrogradsky island. Since 27 May 2015 the lower floor house an entrance to a transfer corridor equipped with moving walkway which link the station to the exit on the north-eastern side of Vasilyevsky island.

== Nearby landmarks ==
The station is near the Petrovsky Stadium, the former home stadium of the city's home football team and Yubileyny Sports Palace. The station closed during and immediately after the team's home games, mostly due to apprehension over riot damage. The station is also located within walking distance of Peter and Paul Fortress.

== Transport ==
Buses: 1, 10, 47, 128, 191, 227, 230, 249, 275. Trolleybuses: 1, 7, 9, 31. Trams: 6, 40 T1.

== Gallery ==
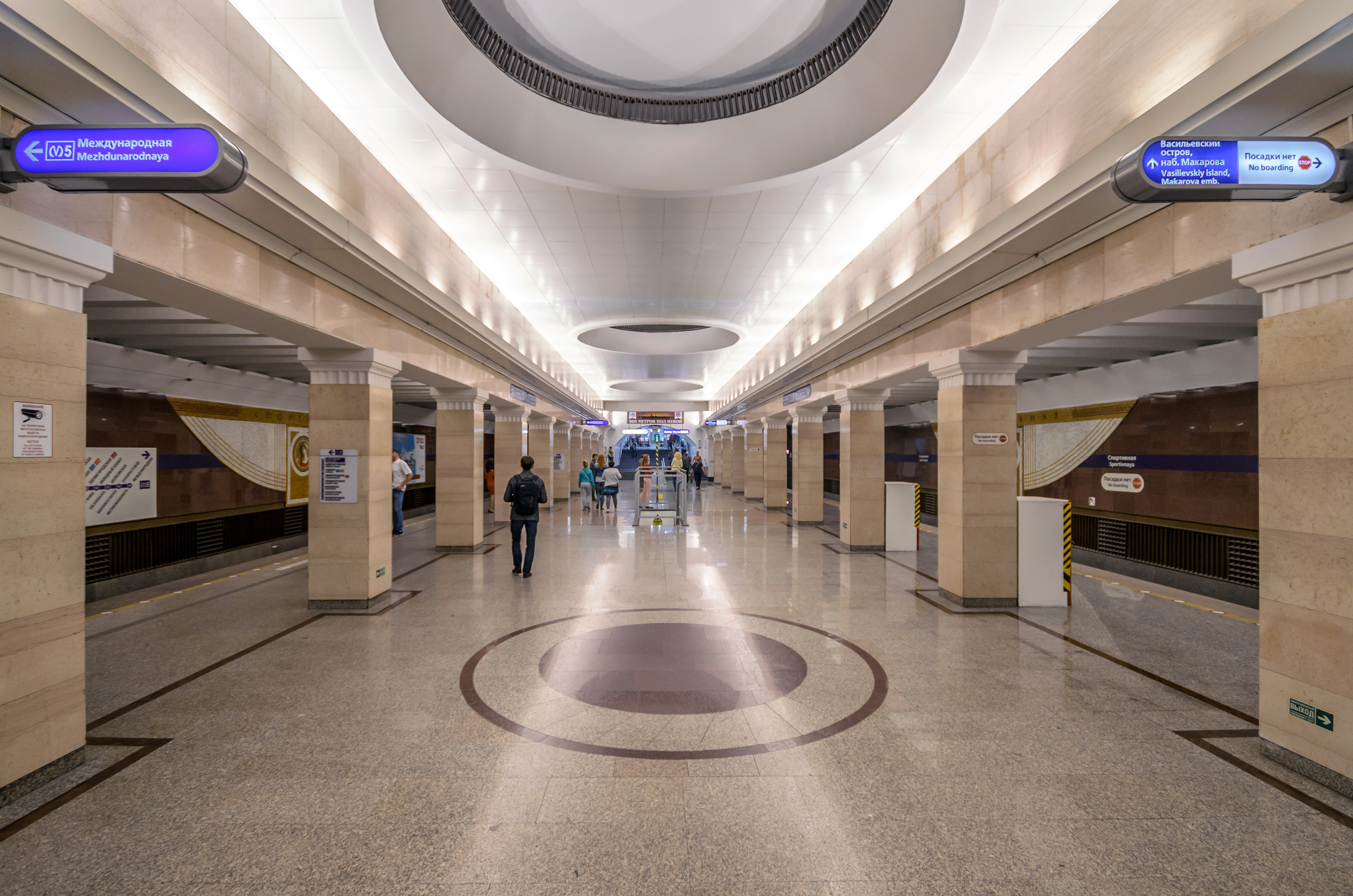
Lower level

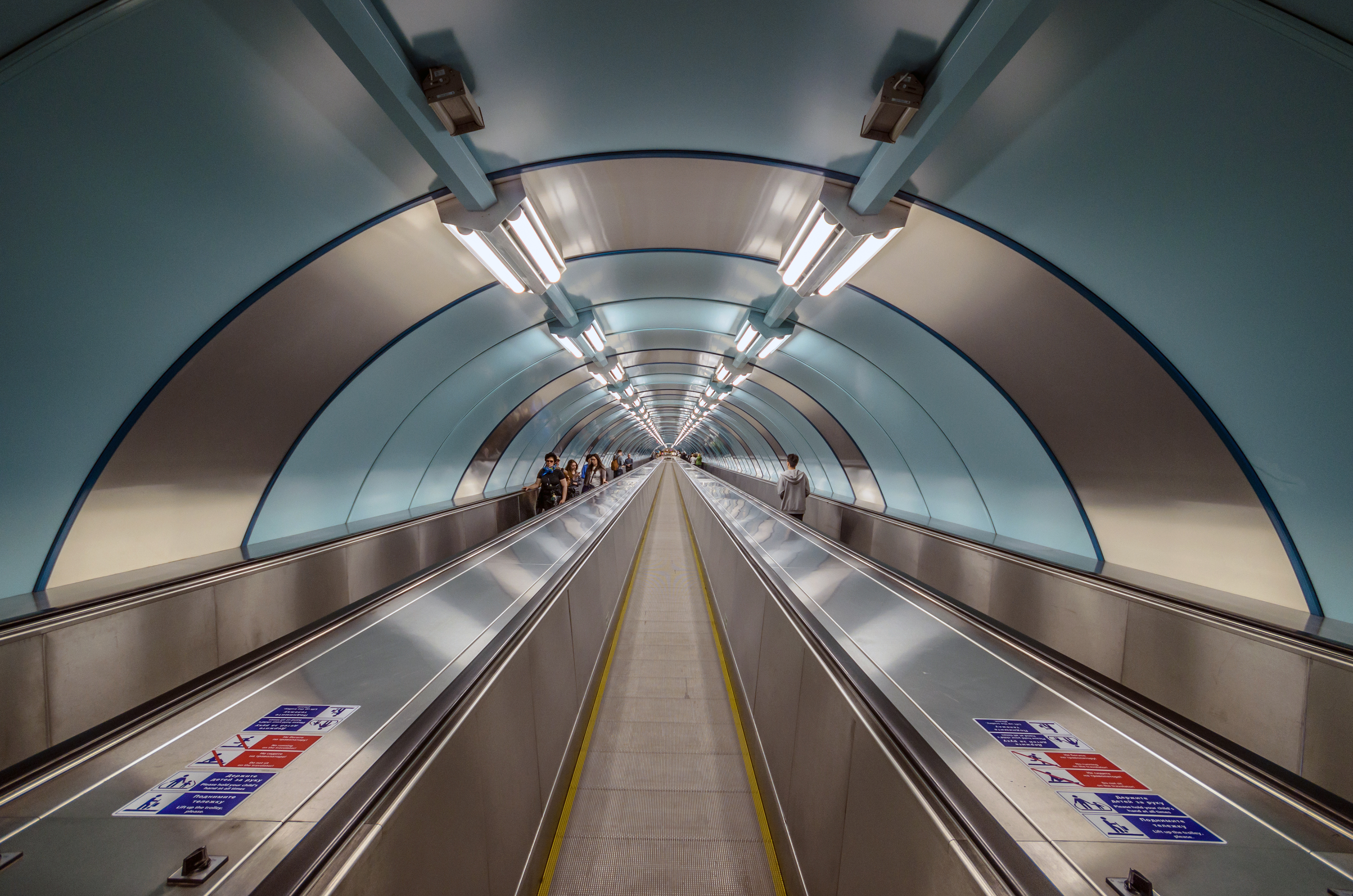
An inclined travelator at Sportivnaya station on the Saint Petersburg Metro, Russia
