= Chkalovskaya (Saint Petersburg Metro) =

Saint Petersburg Metro Station

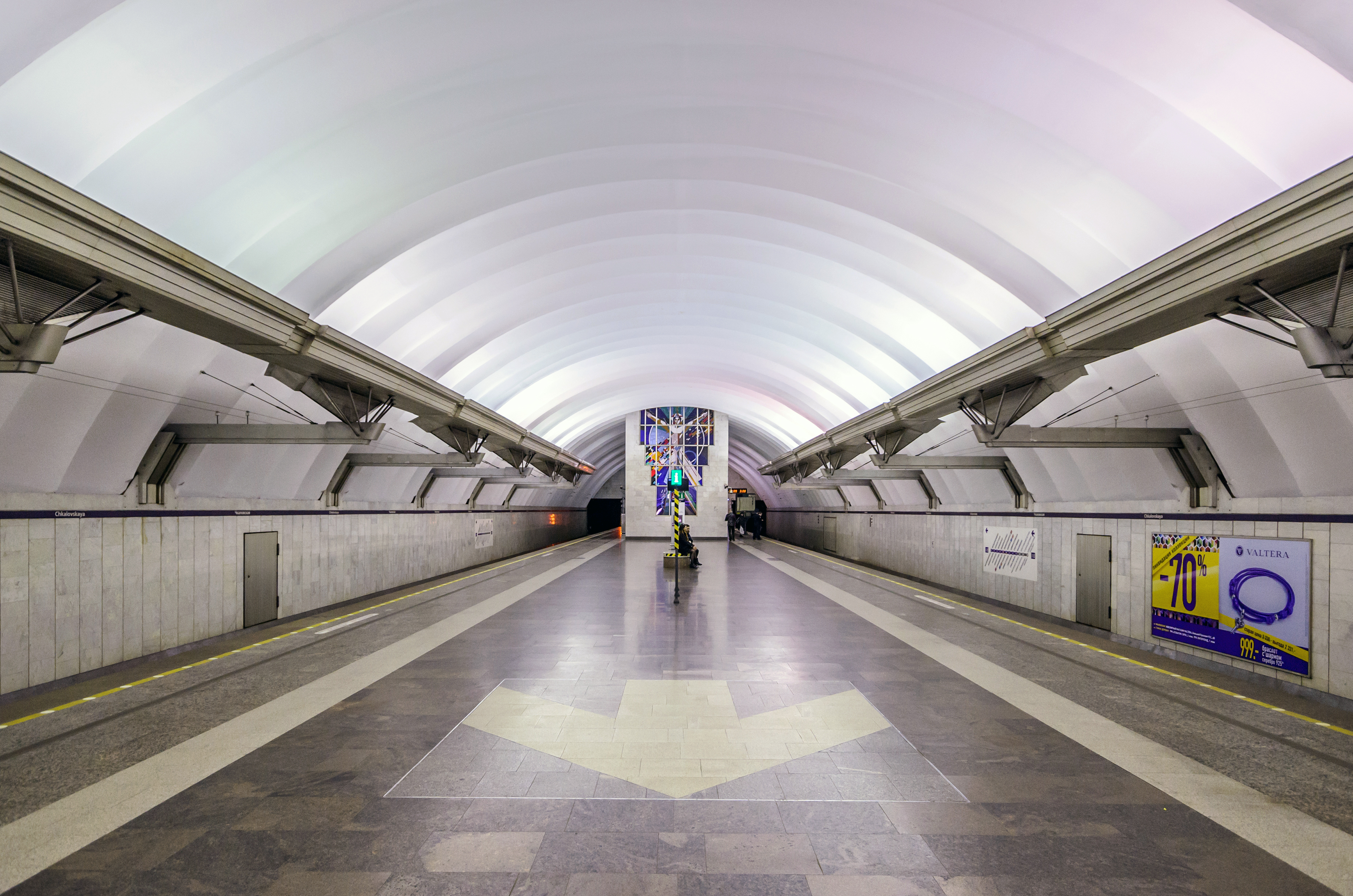
- Station Hall

General information
- Location: 12, Big str. of Zelenin, Petrogradsky District; Saint Petersburg; Russia
- Coordinates: 59.961056°N 30.292028°E
- System: Saint Petersburg Metro station
- Operator: Saint Petersburg Metro
- Line: Frunzensko–Primorskaya Line
- Platforms: 1 (Island platform)
- Tracks: 2

Construction
- Structure type: Underground
- Depth: ≈60 m (197 ft)
- Parking: No
- Cycle facilities: Yes

History
- Opened: September 15, 1997
- Electrified: 825 V DC by low third rail

Services
Preceding station	Saint Petersburg Metro	Following station
Krestovsky Ostrov towards Komendantsky Prospekt	Line 5	Sportivnaya towards Shushary
Route map
Location

Chkalovskaya (Russian: Чка́ловская) is a station on the Frunzensko-Primorskaya Line of the Saint Petersburg Metro. The station was designed by Alexander Konstantinov, Alexander Bystrov and Andrey Larionov. It opened on September 15, 1997, as a Pravoberezhnaya Line station, but it was transferred to Frunzensko-Primorskaya Line on March 7, 2009. The station was named after Valery Chkalov, a famous Russian aviator. A sculpture of him, which was created by V. Sveshnikov, was erected by the station's entrance. The station's decoration features an aviation theme. The floor design invokes airport landing strips, while the lights look like components of the ANT-6 aircraft. The escalator lamps were designed to resemble propellers.

== Transport ==
Buses: 1, 14, 25, 185, 191.

== In popular culture ==
- In 2006 the station has served as a scene for a movie «Piter FM» (dir. Oksana Bychkova). Main characters set up an appointment at the monument of Valery Chkalov.
