= Volkovsky =

Volkovsky (masculine), Volkovskaya (feminine), or Volkovskoye (neuter) may refer to:

- Volkovsky (rural locality) (Volkovskaya, Volkovskoye), name of several rural localities in Russia
- Volkovskaya (Saint Petersburg Metro), a metro station of the Saint Petersburg Metro, Russia
- Volkovskoye Municipal Okrug, a municipal okrug of Frunzensky District of Saint Petersburg, Russia
