= Krestovsky Ostrov (Saint Petersburg Metro) =

Saint Petersburg Metro Station

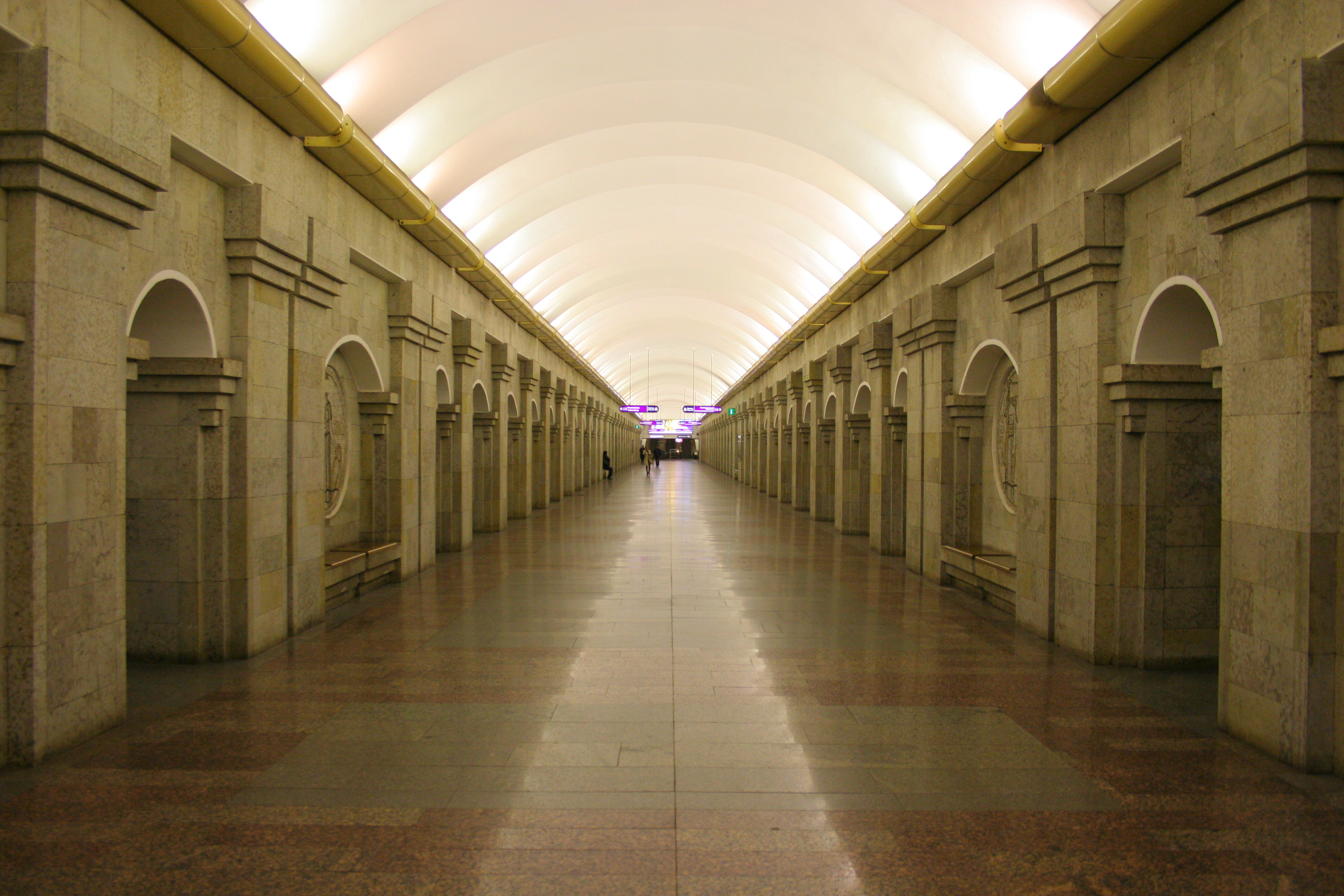
- Station Hall

General information
- Location: Morskoy avenue/Ryukhina street, Petrogradsky District; Saint Petersburg; Russia
- Coordinates: 59.971781°N 30.259442°E
- System: Saint Petersburg Metro station
- Operator: Saint Petersburg Metro
- Line: Frunzensko–Primorskaya Line
- Platforms: 1 (Island platform)
- Tracks: 2

Construction
- Structure type: Underground
- Depth: ≈49 m (161 ft)

History
- Opened: September 3, 1999
- Electrified: 825 V DC low third rail

Services
Preceding station	Saint Petersburg Metro	Following station
Staraya Derevnya towards Komendantsky Prospekt	Line 5	Chkalovskaya towards Shushary
Route map
Location

Krestovsky Ostrov (Russian: Крестовский остров, Krestovsky island) is a station on the Frunzensko-Primorskaya Line of Saint Petersburg Metro, opened on September 3, 1999. It should have been opened earlier but the opening was postponed due to delays in the construction of the station lobby. It serves Krestovsky Island and Krestovsky Stadium, home of FC Zenit Saint Petersburg.

== Transport ==
Buses: 10, 14, 25, 29, 220, 227.
