= Staraya derevnya =

Experimental psychedelic band

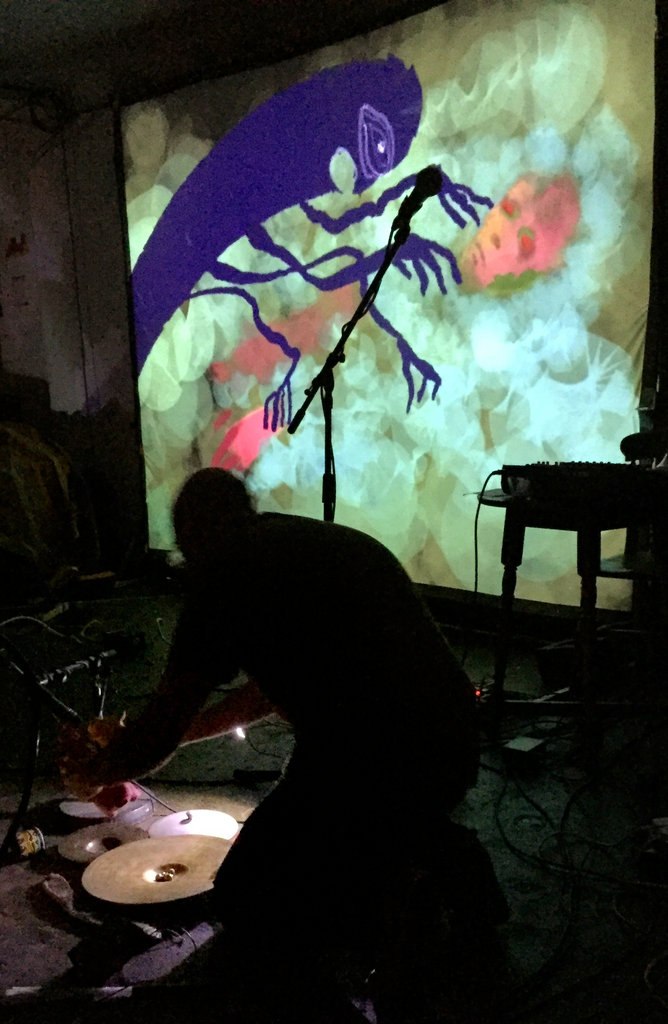
- Staraya derevnya performing live in London Cafe Oto in 2017

Background information
- Also known as: Старая деревня
- Origin: Tel Aviv, Israel / London, UK
- Genres: Psychedelic folk; krautrock; post punk; free improvisation; experimental
- Years active: 1994 – present
- Labels: Auris Media records; Ramble records; Blue tapes; Raash records; Steep gloss; TQN-aut; Otoroku; Linear Obsessional Recordings
- Members: Gosha Shtasel; Ran Nahmias; Maya Pik; Grundik Kasyansky; Danil Gertman; Miguel Pérez
- Past members: Amos Ungar; Igor Kungurov; Kirill Taltaev; Paul Turrell; Uri Borodin
- Website: starayaderevnya.co.uk

Staraya derevnya (Russian: Старая деревня, "Old village") is an experimental psychedelic band that has been active since 1994. It is named after the historic district of Saint Petersburg. The group's music style is self-defined as "krautfolk" and is characterised by free-form jams, hypnotic rhythmic patterns and an eclectic mix of instruments. Their live performances are described as played in near-total darkness in order to shift audience attention to projected animated paintings, improvised together with the music.

== Discography ==
Studio albums

- Garden window escape (2025), Ramble records, Auris Media records
- Boulder blues (2022), Ramble records
- Inwards opened the floor. (2020), Raash records
- Still life with apples, Collaboration with Hans Grusel's Krankenkabinet (2020), Steep Gloss
- Kadita sessions (2016)
- From inside the log (2010)
- Expedition (1999, Remastered edition 2009)

Live albums

- Blue forty-nine (2023), Blue tapes
- Oto / Tusk (2020), TQN-aut
- Live at Cafe Oto 13.10.17 (2018), OTORoku

Compilations

- Forgot what was important (2022), Ramble records
- A view from a hill (2017), Linear Obsessional Recordings
- Utterances (2016), Linear Obsessional Recordings
- Gnashing of the teeth of time (2013), Weakie Disks
- Сеть-5 Альмагест (2001), Bomba-Piter

Singles

- I'm thicket (2008)
- Onelegged (2007)
