= Zvenigorodskaya =

Saint Petersburg Metro Station

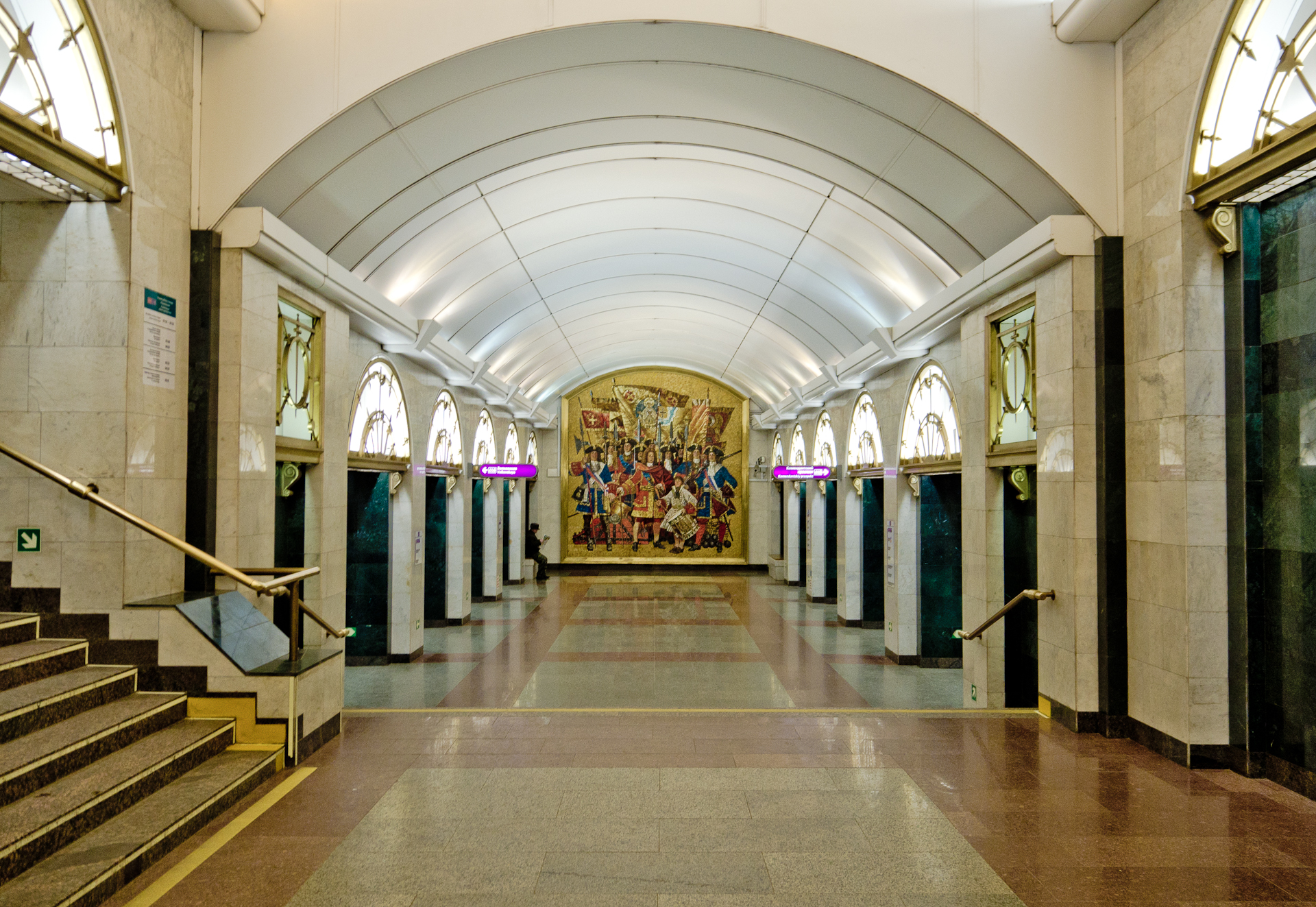
- Station Hall

General information
- Location: Admiralteysky District; Saint Petersburg; Russia
- Coordinates: 59.922389°N 30.335722°E
- System: Saint Petersburg Metro station
- Operator: Saint Petersburg Metro
- Line: Frunzensko–Primorskaya Line
- Platforms: 1 (Island platform)
- Tracks: 2

Construction
- Structure type: Underground
- Depth: ≈57 m (187 ft)
- Parking: No
- Cycle facilities: Yes

History
- Opened: December 20, 2008
- Electrified: 825 V DC low third rail

Services
Preceding station	Saint Petersburg Metro	Following station
Sadovaya towards Komendantsky Prospekt	Line 5	Obvodny Kanal towards Shushary
Vladimirskaya towards Devyatkino	Line 1 transfer at Pushkinskaya	Tekhnologichesky Institut towards Prospekt Veteranov
Location

Zvenigorodskaya is a station on the Saint Petersburg Metro. It is located between the Sadovaya and Obvodny Kanal stations on the Frunzensko–Primorskaya Line. The station was opened on December 20, 2008, one of the first on the new line. It is connected by foot passages to the Pushkinskaya station, which serves the Kirovsko–Vyborgskaya Line. At the time of its opening, Zvenigorodskaya lacked an independent surface exit; all traffic had to go through Pushkinskaya. Escalators and a surface lobby were added later.

== Transport ==
Buses: 225, 262, 290.

Trolleybuses: 3, 8, 15, 17.

Trams: 16.

== Concourse ==
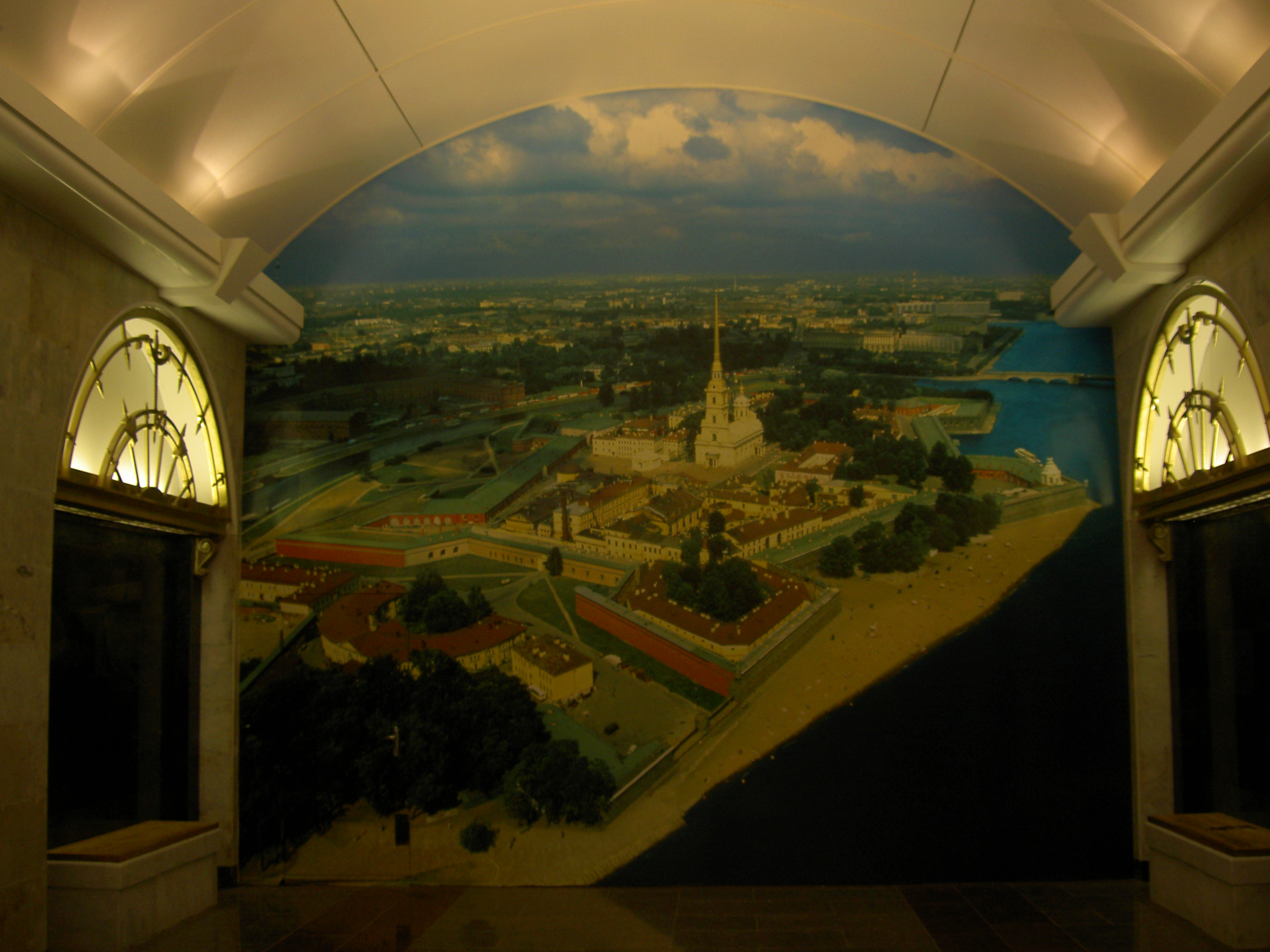
Photo wallpaper with a townscape

According to initial data from the Saint Petersburg Metro press service, a concourse building was planned by architect Alexander Konstantinov, and described as a two-storey building with a portico, harmoniously integrated into the architectural ensemble of the former Semyonovsky regiment barracks.

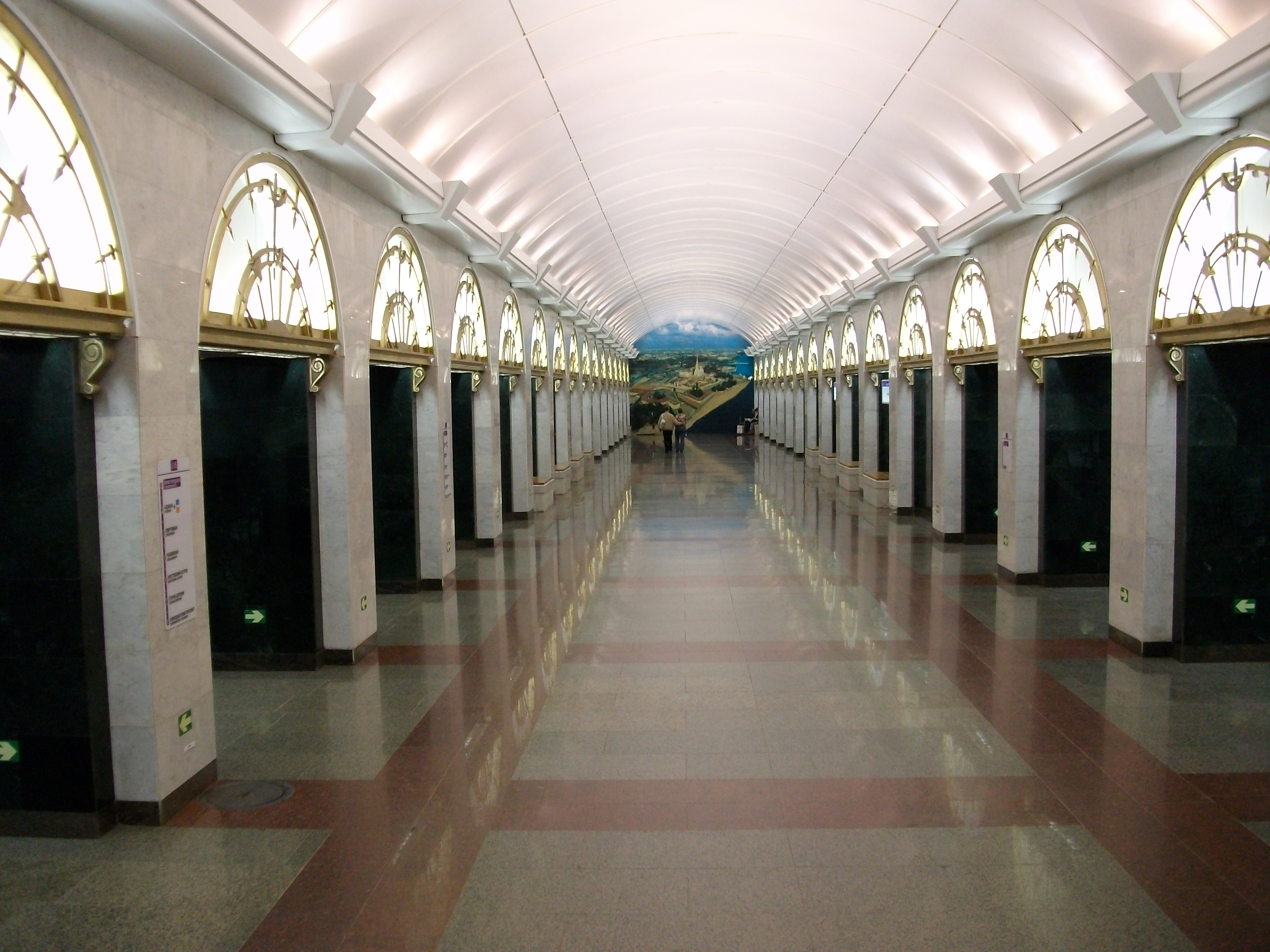
Underground hall

A specially constructed building was planned to be situated between houses No. 1 and No. 3 on Zvenigorodskaya Street. Originally, it was intended to resemble the appearance of the Semyonovsky Regiment barracks, the ground floor to house the concourse, while the second floor was designated for Saint Petersburg Metro services. Eventually, a five-storey shopping mall designed by the "Adamant" company was authorised.

== Underground hall ==
Zvenigorodskaya was originally designed as a deep column station. However, due to a long construction break, it was decided to replace part of the column complex with a wall. This decision helped prevent the displacement of already established columns. The lateral tunnels of the station have an increased diameter of 9.8 meters (32 feet) compared to typical columned stations in Russia. The average hall has a typical distance between the axes of columns of 3.8 meters (12 feet) in the longitudinal direction and 8 meters (26 feet) in the cross-section.

The original project of the station was executed by Russian architect Alexander Konstantinov. However, after its opening, it was declared that the authors of the project were a group of architects from the Open Society "Lenmetrogiprotrans," led by N. V. Romashkin-Timanov. The team included N. V. Romashkin-Timanov, Yu. V. Eechko, D. A. Bojtsov, and N. A. Vinogradova.

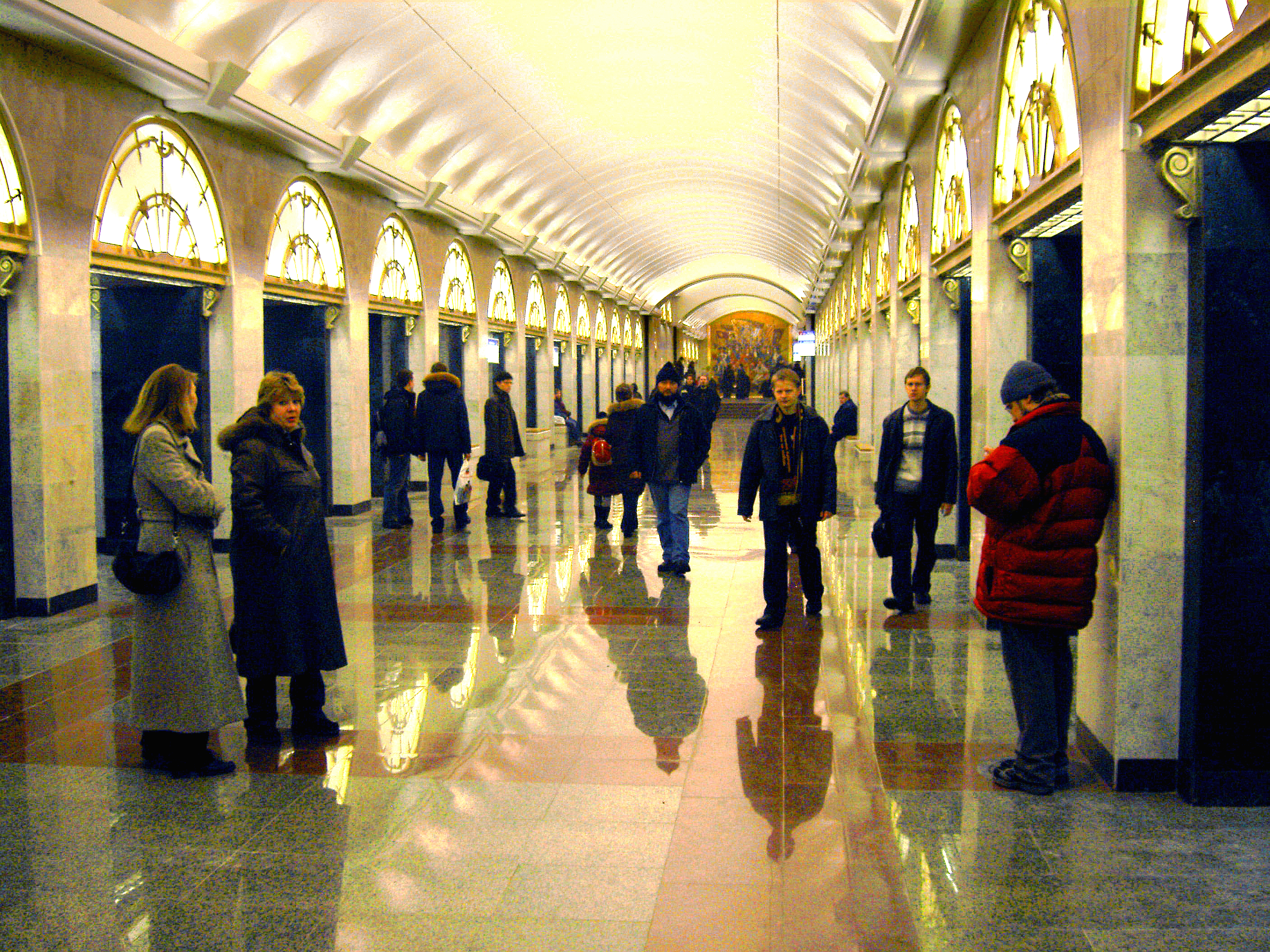
Columns in underground hall

The decoration of the underground part of the station also reflects themes related to the Semyonovsky Regiment, whose barracks were located around the station's surface exit. The floor is constructed from green granite, Rakhi Green (India), with color inserts and trim made from red granite, Imperial Red (India). The walls are clad in Koelga marble, Kashin granite, and dark green marble, Indiana Green (India). The selection of the supplier and the stones from India was made by the leading natural stone expert, Vladimir Shestakov.

The station features mosaic panels made of smalt depicting the first soldiers of the Semyonovsky regiment who served during the reign of Peter the Great. These panels were crafted by the Russian Academy of Arts, with the artist Alexander Bystrov as the creator.

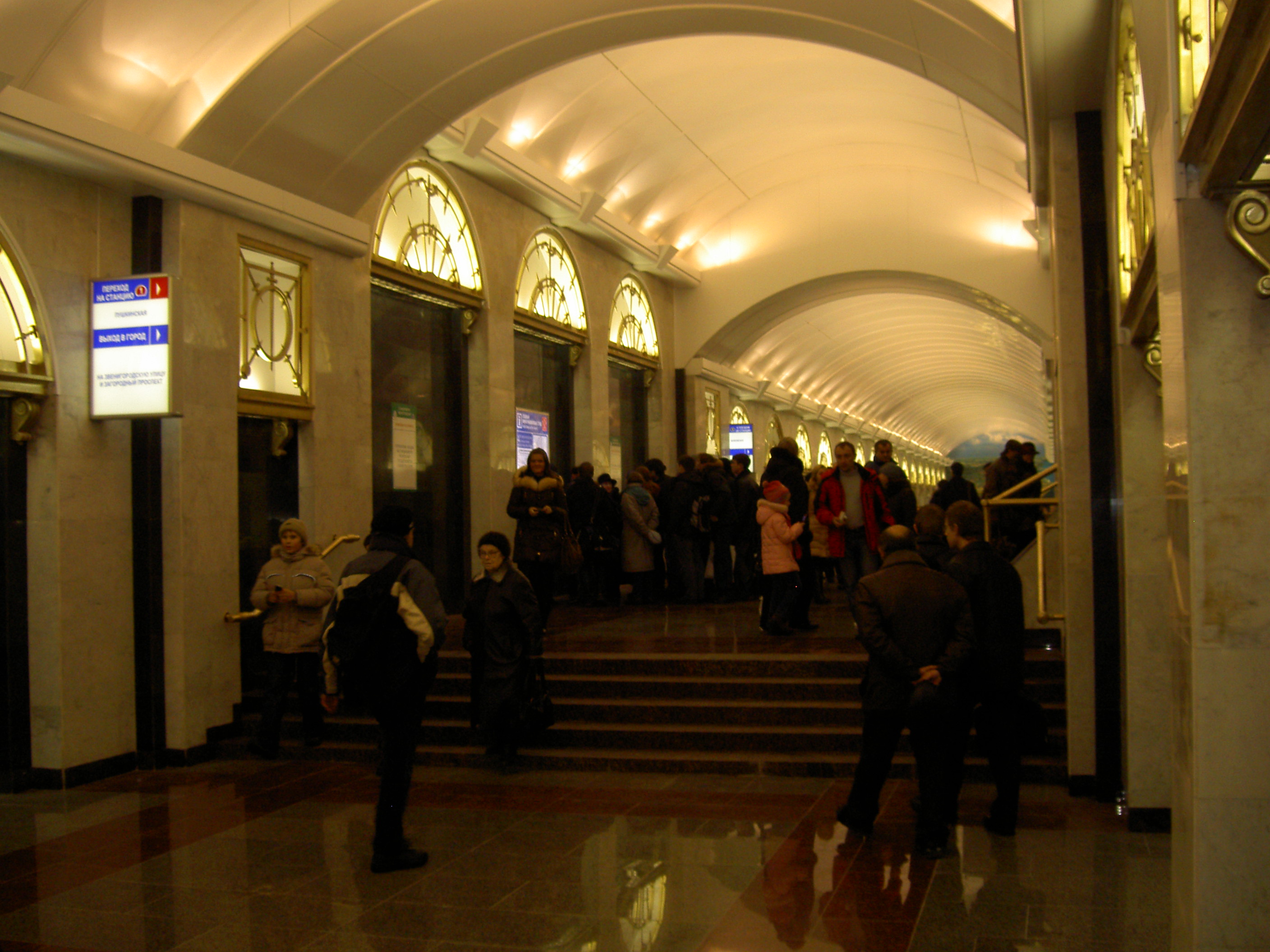
Eminence in the centre of station

The station's illumination is provided by fixtures installed at the tops of the columns.

== Switch ==
The Zvenigorodskaya station on the Frunzensko-Primorskaya Line and the Pushkinskaya station on the Kirovsko-Vyborgskaya Line are connected by a foot tunnel. This is the first transfer foot tunnel in the Saint Petersburg Metro, to be constructed after a long break. The previous transfer tunnel was built 18 years earlier at the Sadovaya station and opened in December 1991. The design of the new tunnel incorporated innovative techniques for the underground railway system.

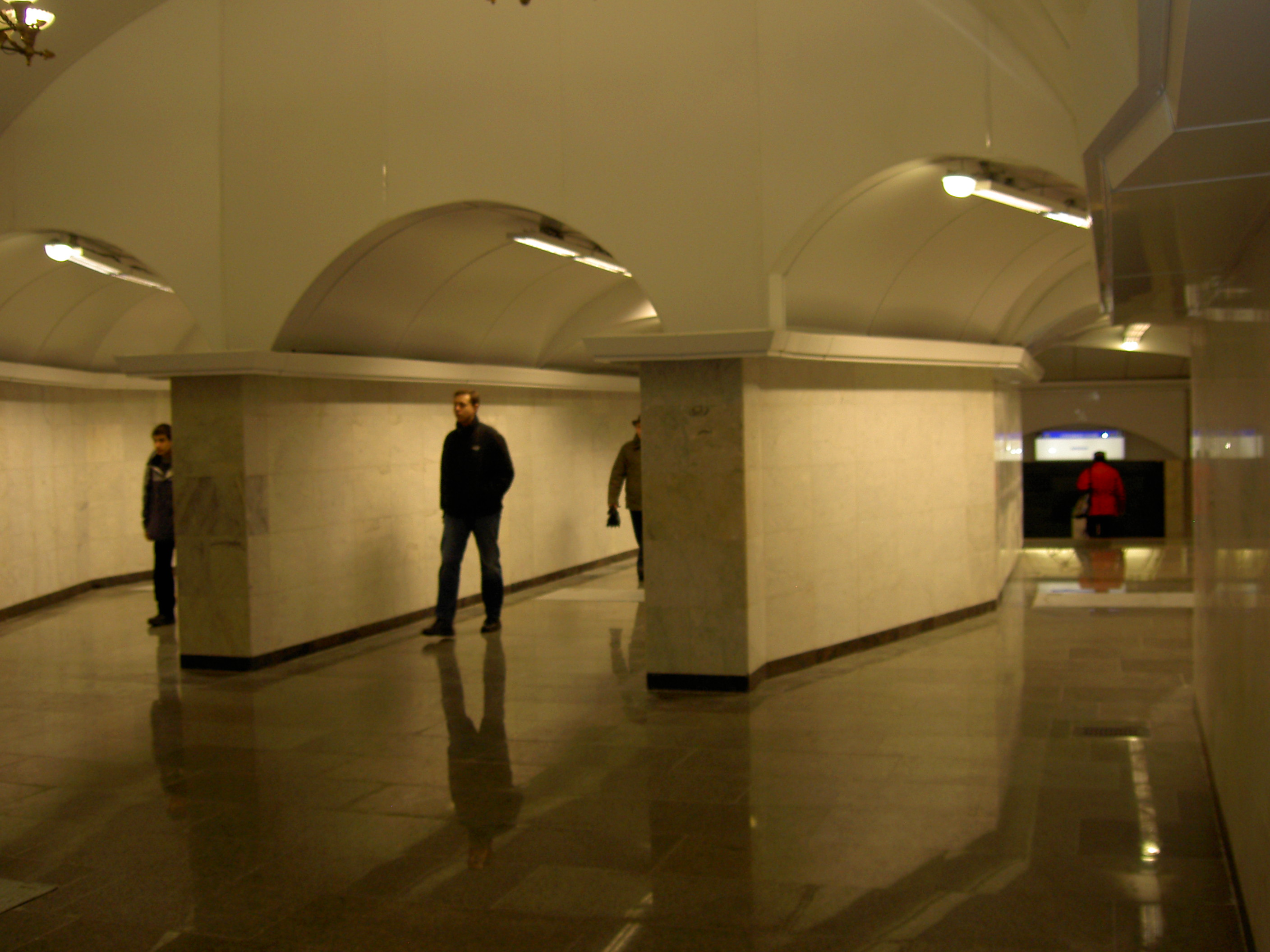
Three corridors to station

At Zvenigorodskaya station, the central part of the average hall is separated from the platforms by walls. This design has allowed the central part to be elevated above the station floor, with two longitudinal escalators leading to it. In the transition area above, ladders lead to three corridors that connect to a small hall.

The tunneling was carried out simultaneously from this hall to both stations. From the hall leading to Pushkinskaya, there are two corridors that end with ladders. These ladders replaced a pylon and two passages adjacent to it.

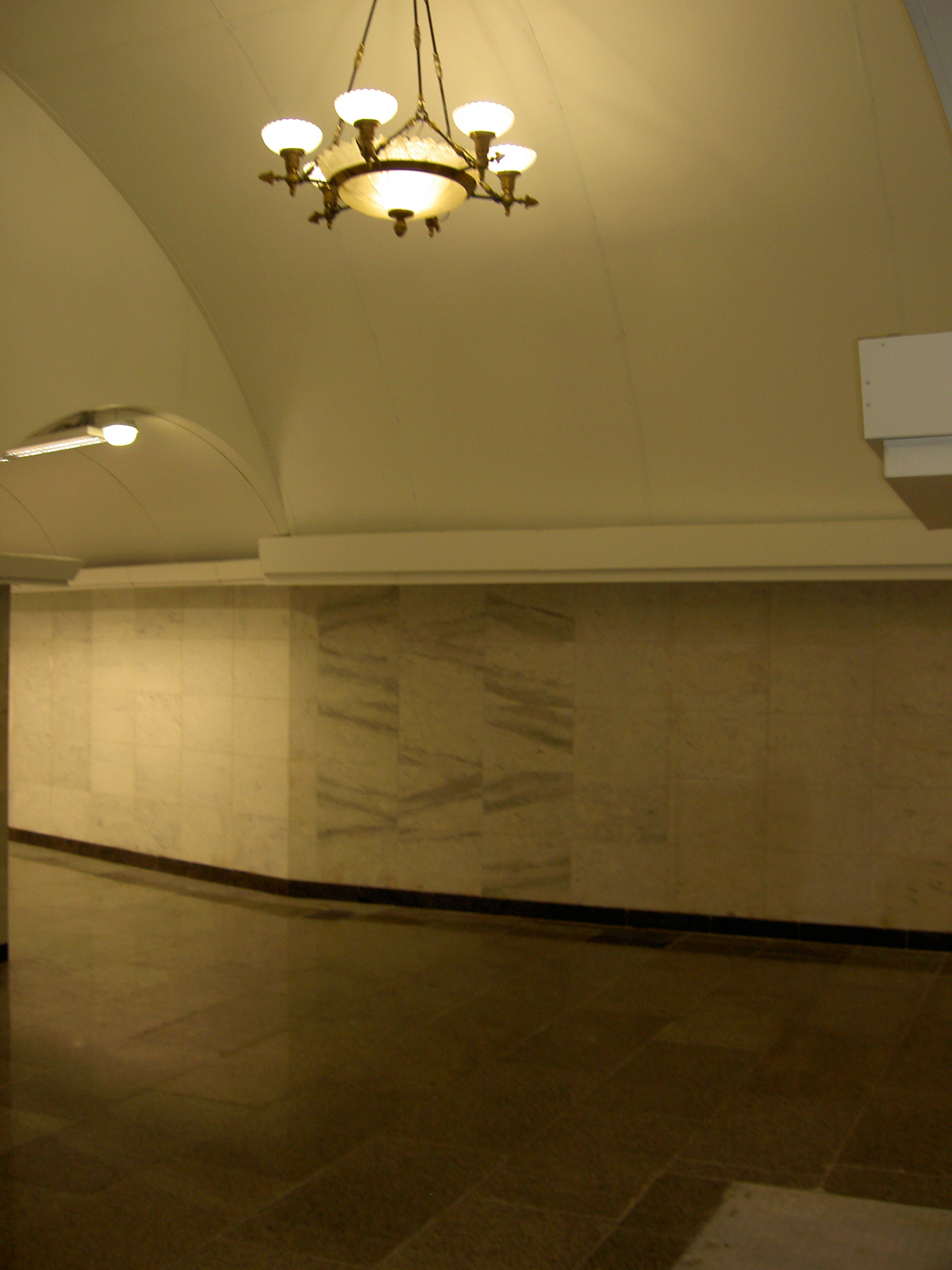
The chandelier in new place

During the construction of the transition, two chandeliers that illuminated the ceiling of the Pushkinskaya station platform were removed. These chandeliers were subsequently installed in the hall where the transition corridors lead.

== Building history ==
Several construction organizations worked on the Zvenigorodskaya station:

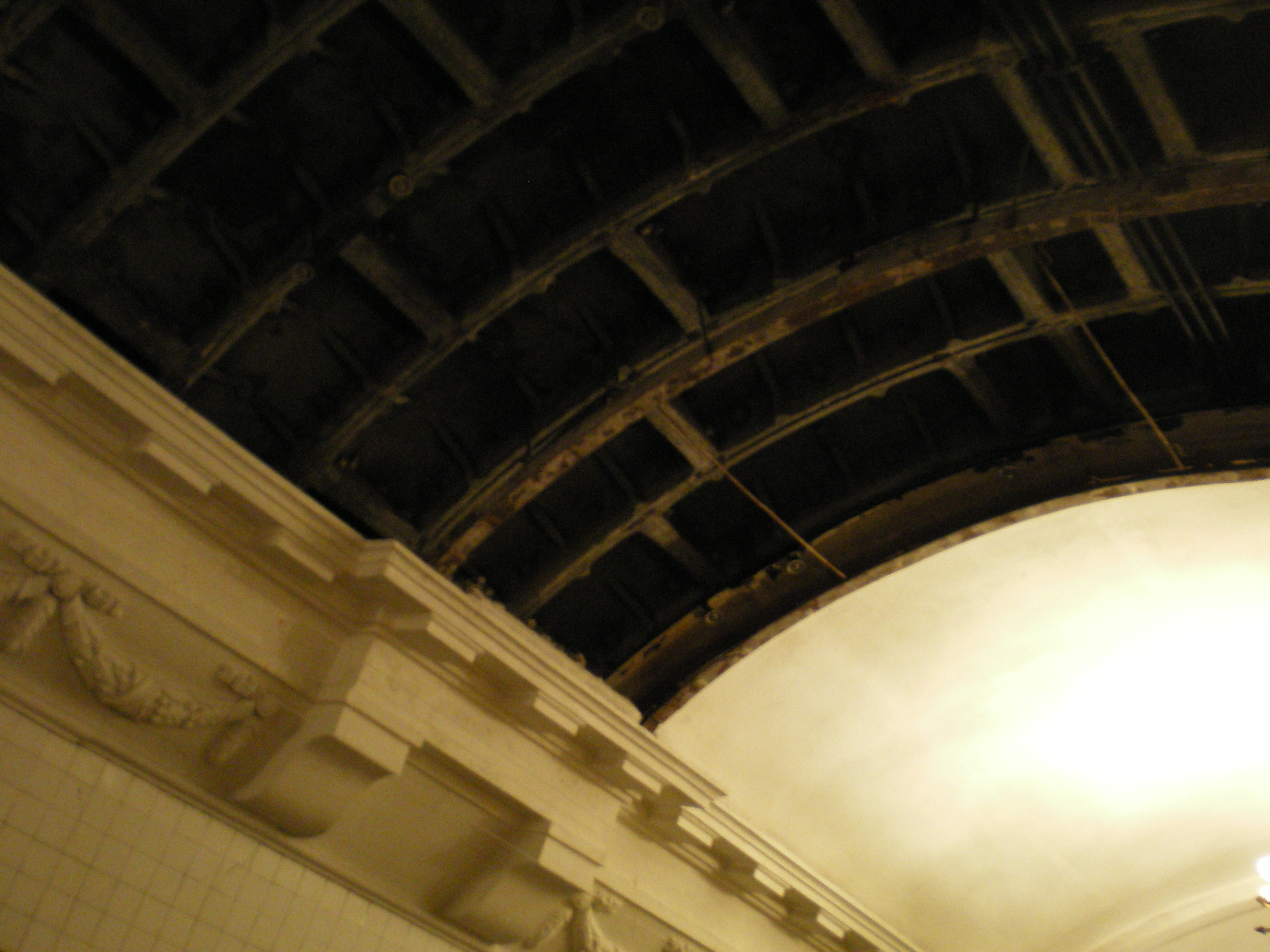
The disassembled ceiling over a platform of Pushkinskaya

- Tunnel group number 3. The chief engineer is Victor Tishkin (general construction).
- Construction management-19 (finishing work).
- "Adamant" company (concourse building).

The construction of the station was completed in three stages:

=== Projects ===
In 1990, projects for the stations, including Zvenigorodskaya, were developed. Rough tunnels for train movement were completed. However, construction was subsequently halted, and the building was left in a preserved state.

=== Station and switch ===
The station and the underground transfer were built in 2007–2008. In July 2007, the arches and walls separating the central hall from the platforms were constructed.

In January 2008, a significant number of problems were resolved:

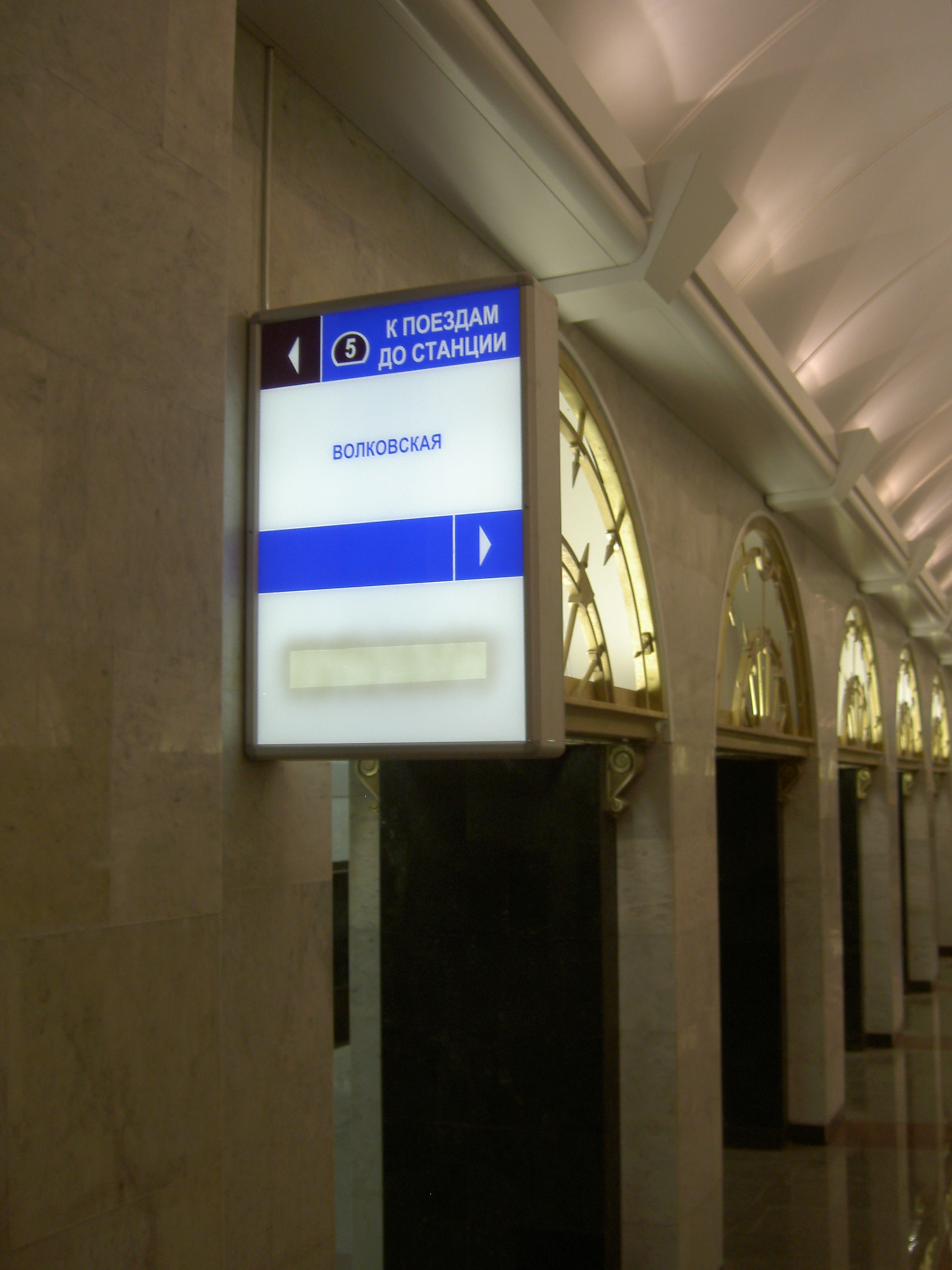
To Volkovskaya

1. The continuous-column complex was fully constructed.
2. The dismantling of the wagonhead vaults is almost finished.
3. The tunnel to Pushkinskaya station had been completed.
4. At Pushkinskaya station, the area beneath the ladder building is fenced off. The dismantling of the canopies over the left station tunnel has been completed.

On November 27, 2008, the mosaic panel was fully completed.
Dates of opening of station underground hall
The station was originally scheduled to open on December, 1st 2008. However, in July 2007, the opening date was postponed to December 18, 2008. In November 2008, the management of Saint Petersburg Metro announced a new opening date of December 24, 2008. Ultimately, the station was solemnly opened on December 20, 2008, and began operations.

From December 20, 2008, to March 7, 2009, train service from the station was operated in shuttle mode until the opening of Spasskaya station and the division of the Pravoberejnaya line.

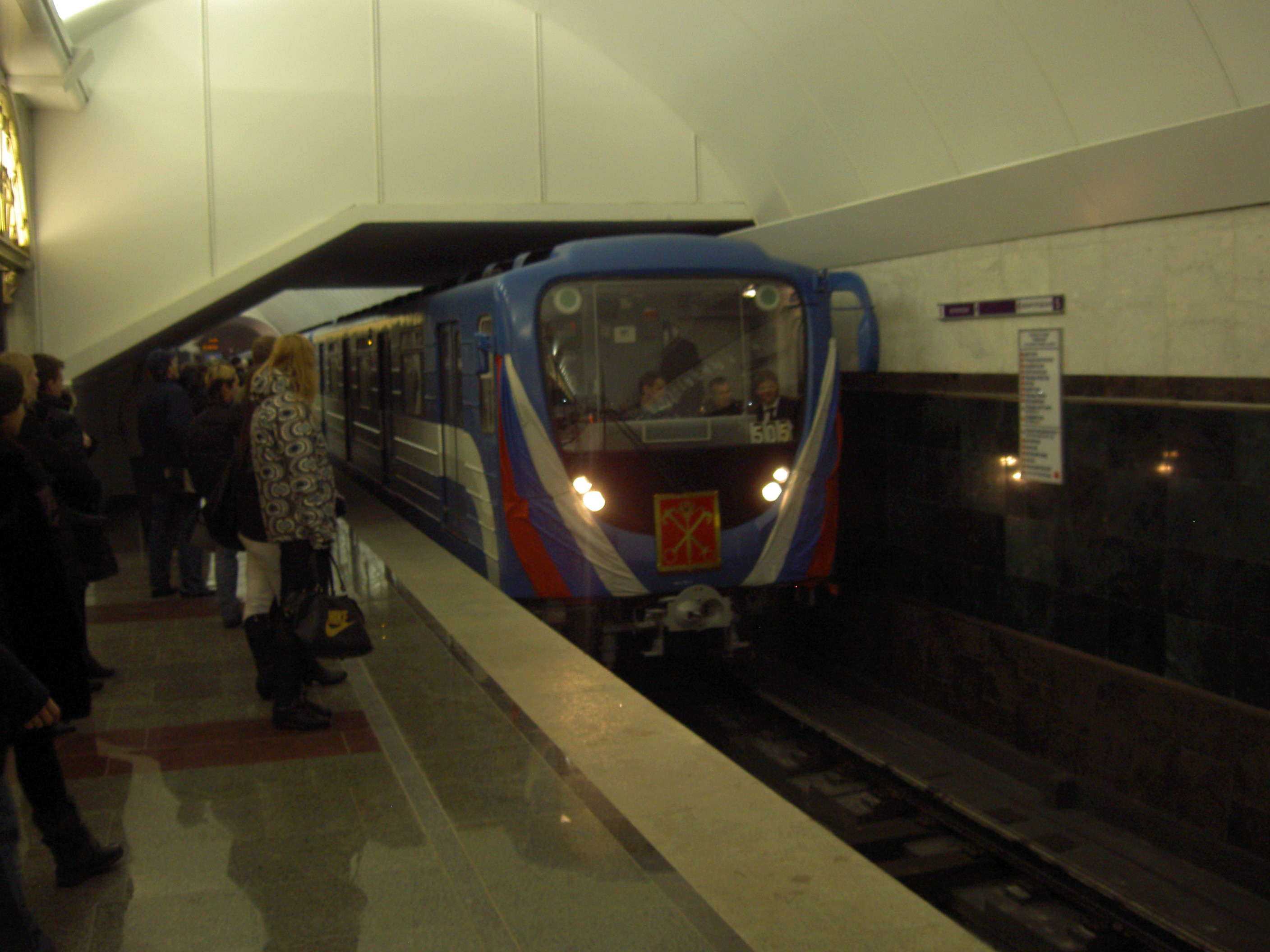
This train moves against the future correct direction of movement

=== Direct exit on a surface ===
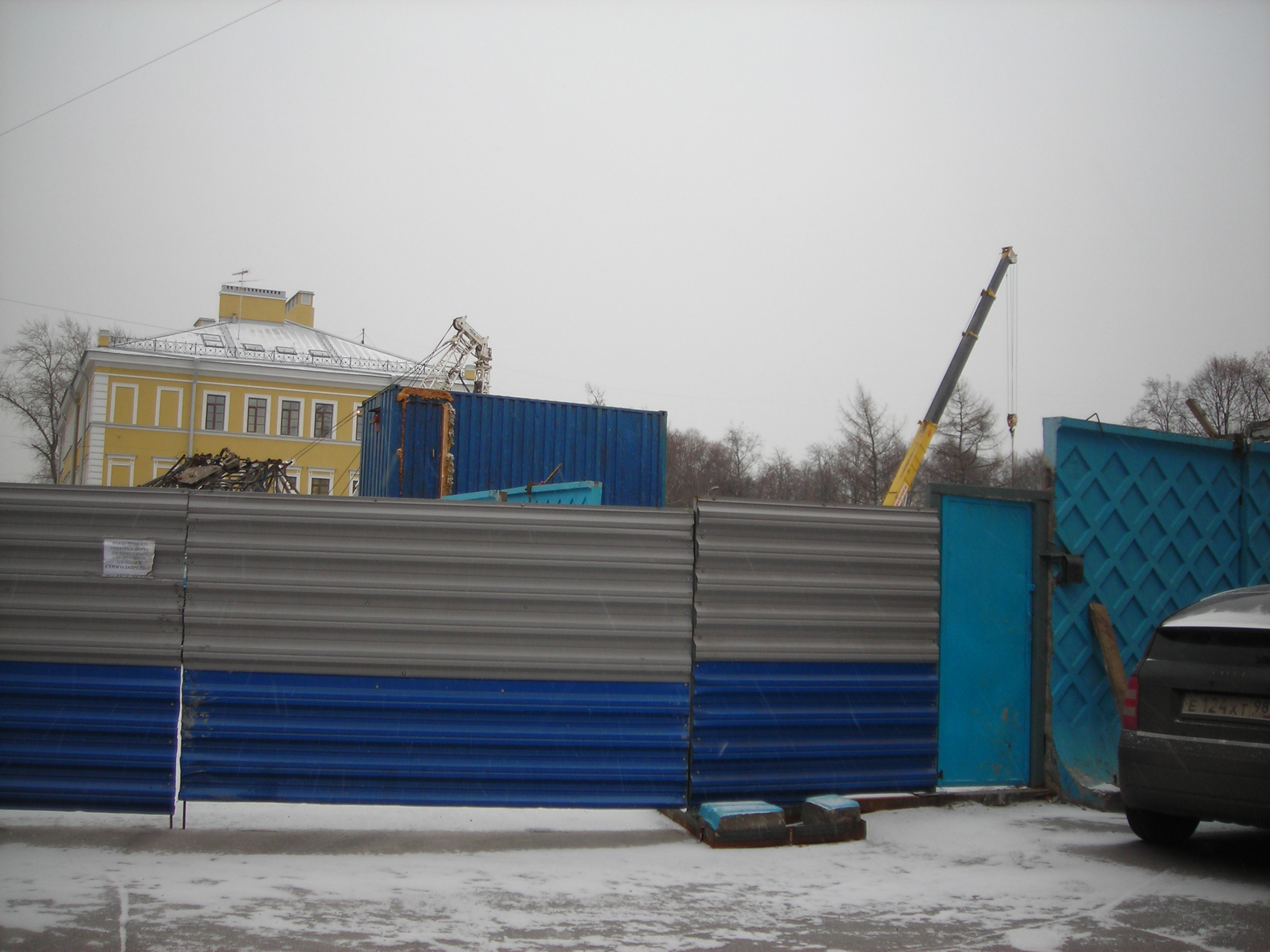
Building site in 2007

The direct surface exit was constructed starting in 2007. In July 2007, work began on the construction of the lobby and the inclined escalator.

We prepare a ground for passage, it is always heavy to pass the first 50 metres in Saint Petersburg, because continuous watery strata. On Zvenigorodskaya a situation one of the most difficult, therefore it is necessary to freeze not simply a ground as did builders of underground railways half a century ago, but also to strengthen its cement. Such system is more reliable.

— Vladimir Maslak, The chief engineer of service of capital construction of Saint Petersburg Metro, Interview to "Izvestia" newspaper

In January 2008, work began in several areas:
1. At the site of the station's land lobby, frozen chemical soil consolidation and excavation for the foundation of the 3-4 story lobby buildings were carried out.
2. The building project has been approved.

In August 2009, work was completed on the installation of all four escalators. Following this, the installation of the ferro-concrete walls for the ground floor began. Above the station, four floors of a shopping center were to be constructed.

Dates for the opening of the direct surface exit
The initial opening date was set for January 2009. By November, the plan was to move the opening to July 2009.
