= Admiralteyskaya (Saint Petersburg Metro) =

Saint Petersburg Metro Station

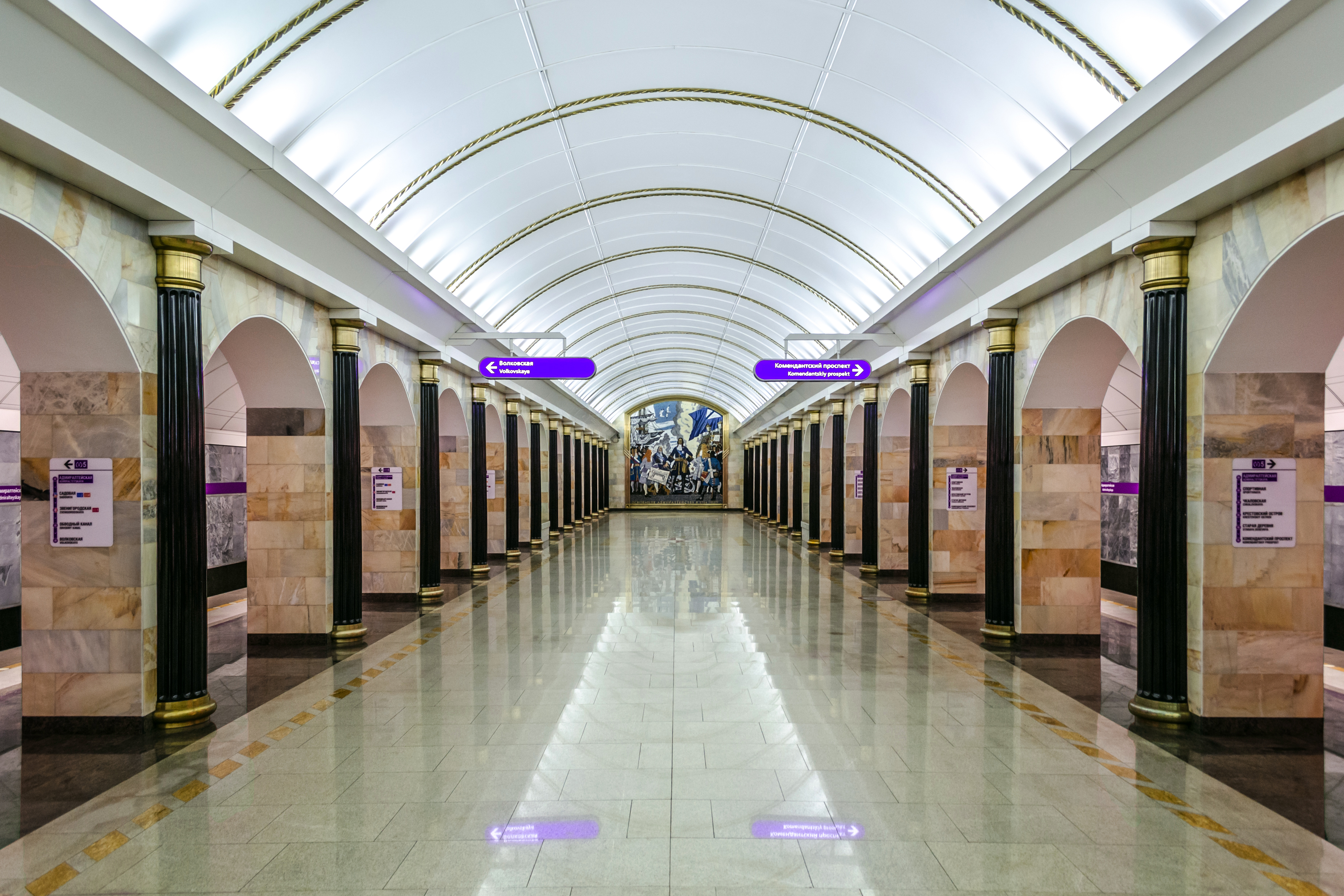
- Station hall

General information
- Location: Admiralteysky District; Saint Petersburg; Russia
- Coordinates: 59.9361°N 30.3148°E
- System: Saint Petersburg Metro station
- Operator: Saint Petersburg Metro
- Line: Frunzensko-Primorskaya Line
- Platforms: 1 (Island platform)
- Tracks: 2

Construction
- Structure type: Underground
- Depth: 86 metres (282 ft)
- Parking: No
- Cycle facilities: No

History
- Opened: 28 December 2011
- Electrified: 825 V DC low third rail

Services
Preceding station	Saint Petersburg Metro	Following station
Sportivnaya towards Komendantsky Prospekt	Line 5	Sadovaya towards Shushary
Route map
Location

Admiralteyskaya (Russian: Адмиралте́йская) is a station on the Frunzensko-Primorskaya Line of the Saint Petersburg Metro. Opened on 28 December 2011, it is designed to relieve congestion at the Nevsky Prospekt and Gostiny Dvor stations, as well as to provide a more direct link to the Hermitage and other notable museums. However, the completion of the station was hampered by the lack of funds and ongoing controversy over the placement of the station's exit. The station will eventually provide a transfer to the Nevsko-Vasileostrovskaya Line station tentatively designated Admiralteyskaya-2 (the construction of that station has not begun yet). After the exit location was settled, the station Admiralteyskaya-1 on the Frunzensko-Primorskaya Line was scheduled to open in 2008, but concerns over the station's historic significance pushed the opening back. In June 2009, the issue was finally settled and the station opened on 28 December 2011.

The name originates from the Admiralty building, which is located nearby.

== History ==
The station's existence has been controversial for decades. Originally, Admiralteyskaya was going to be built on the Nevsko-Vasileostrovskaya Line, however the construction didn't go underway. Although the need for the station was apparent to the Metro planners for over three decades, the actual construction proved to be a difficult process. The station was to be built close to Hermitage, several notable museums and several buildings designated as federal landmarks, which raised fears that those buildings would be adversely affected by construction. Thus, determining the location of the exit proved to be a difficult task that, after multiple attempts, was finally resolved on February 7, 2007. According to the city officials, it would be built on the site of the apartment building at #1/4 on Kirpichny Alley. The building was to be torn down so that a vestibule could be built in its place.

With the issue seemingly resolved, the city officials began moving out the building's residents, completely emptying it by the end of 2008. However the construction stalled due to the debate over the building's historic significance (it was the first building to be restored after the Siege of Leningrad). In June 2009, the issue was resolved in the Metro's favor (though the ruling stipulated that the building's original facade must be restored once the building is complete) and June 11, 2009, the contractors began to demolish the building. The construction commenced once all the debris were cleared.

When the construction of what was originally intended as the northern branch of the Frunzensko-Primorskaya Line began, the underground vestibule of Admiralteystkaya was built, even as the location of the exit remained uncertain. By 1997, most of the vestibule was completed. However, the lack of resolution over the status of the station's exit, combined with scarcity of funds, put further construction on halt. When the northern branch was opened as a temporary part of the Pravoberezhnaya Line, the train passed the unfinished station without stopping, slowing down slightly while transversing it. However, in 2005, the construction resumed. Trains began to occasionally stop at this station in early morning hours to drop off workers.

== Transport ==
Buses: 2, 7, 3, 10, 22, 24, 27, 191. Trolleybuses: 1, 5, 7, 10, 11, 17, 22.

== Architecture ==
The station is connected to the ground with two consecutive escalators. Since it is very difficult to build escalators longer than 125 metres (410 ft), it was decided to build one long escalator (125 metres (410 ft)) to the intermediate level. From this level a shorter (25 metres (82 ft)) escalator leads to the station. The total depth of the station is 86 metres (282 ft) which makes it the deepest metro station in Saint Petersburg.
