= Obvodny Kanal (Saint Petersburg Metro) =

Saint Petersburg Metro Station

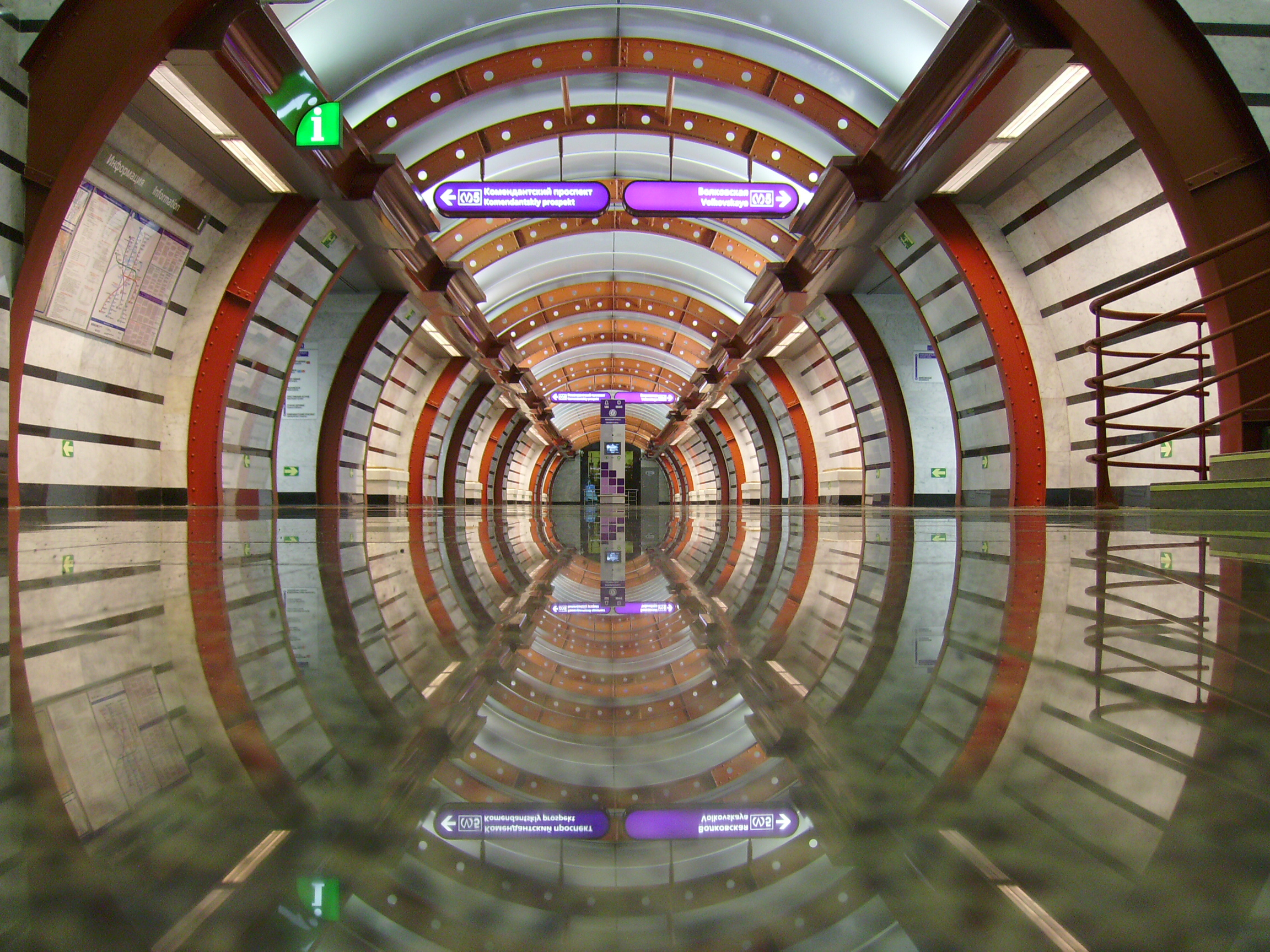
- Station Hall

General information
- Location: Frunzensky District; Saint Petersburg; Russia
- Coordinates: 59.914686°N 30.34815°E
- System: Saint Petersburg Metro station
- Operator: Saint Petersburg Metro
- Line: Frunzensko–Primorskaya Line
- Platforms: 1 (Island platform)
- Tracks: 2

Construction
- Structure type: Underground
- Depth: ≈61 m (200 ft)
- Platform levels: 1
- Parking: No
- Cycle facilities: Yes

History
- Opened: December 30, 2010
- Electrified: 825 V DC low third rail

Services
Preceding station	Saint Petersburg Metro	Following station
Zvenigorodskaya towards Komendantsky Prospekt	Line 5	Volkovskaya towards Shushary
Route map
Location

Obvodny Kanal (Russian: Обводный канал) is a station on the Frunzensko–Primorskaya Line of the Saint Petersburg Metro. The station opened on December 30, 2010, between the already completed Volkovskaya and Zvenigorodskaya stations.

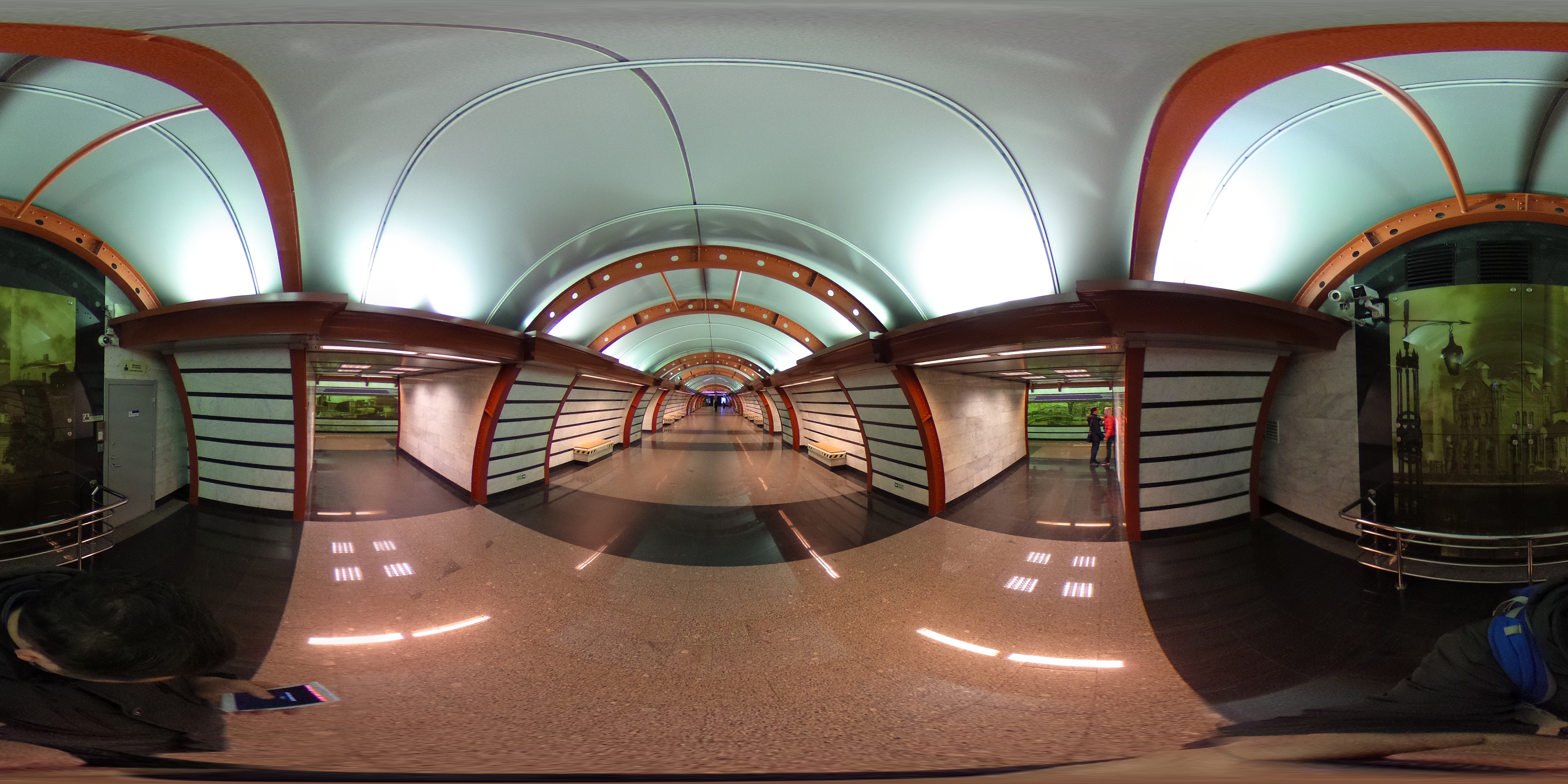
Central hall of Obvodny Kanal station (view as a 360° interactive panorama)

== Transport ==
Buses: 3, 26, 54, 65, 74, 76, 91, and 141. Trams: 16, 25, and 49.
