= Volkoff =

Volkoff is a transliteration variant of the Russian surname Volkov. Notable people with the surname unclude:

- Alexandre Volkoff (actor), Russian director, actor
- George Volkoff, Canadian physicist of Russian origin
- Igor Volkoff, ring name of a French Canadian professional wrestler
- Nikolai Volkoff, ring name of an American professional wrestler of Yugoslav origin
- Vladimir Volkoff, French writer of Russian extraction

== Fictional characters ==
- Alexei Volkoff, an international weapons dealer from the TV series Chuck

== See also ==
- Volkov (disambiguation)
