= Volkovskaya (Saint Petersburg Metro) =

Saint Petersburg Metro Station

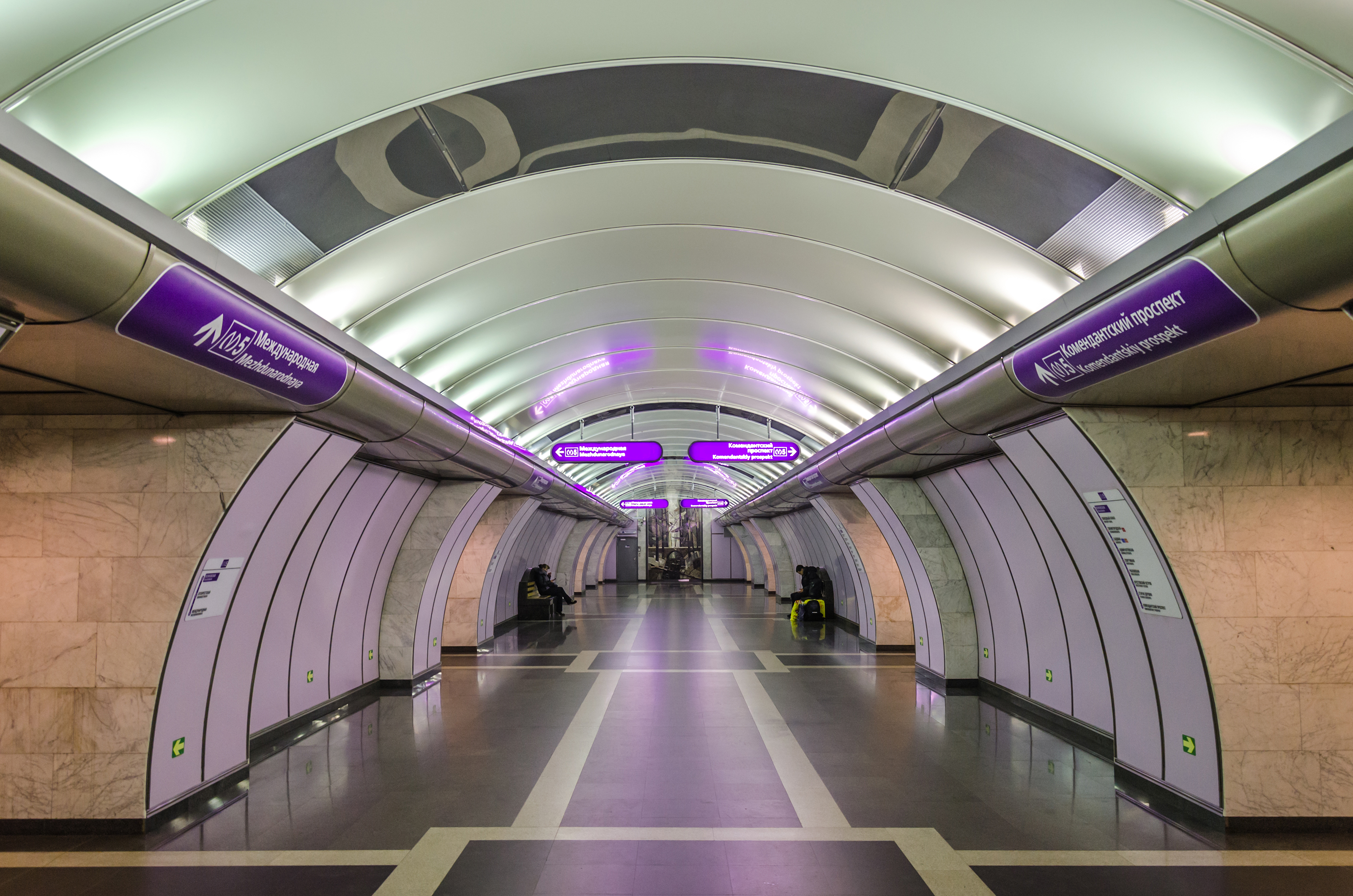
- Station Hall

General information
- Location: Frunzensky District; Saint Petersburg; Russia
- Coordinates: 59.896053°N 30.358475°E
- System: Saint Petersburg Metro station
- Operator: Saint Petersburg Metro
- Line: Frunzensko–Primorskaya Line
- Platforms: 1 (Island platform)
- Tracks: 2

Construction
- Structure type: Underground
- Depth: ≈61 m (200 ft)
- Parking: Yes
- Cycle facilities: Yes

History
- Opened: December 20, 2008
- Electrified: 825 V DC low third rail

Services
| Preceding station | Saint Petersburg Metro | Following station |
|---|---|---|
| Obvodny Kanal towards Komendantsky Prospekt | Line 5 | Bukharestskaya towards Shushary |
Route map
Location

Volkovskaya (Russian: Волковская) is a station on the Frunzensko-Primorskaya Line of the Saint Petersburg Metro. The station opened on December 20, 2008, as the terminus of the newly opened Frunzensko-Primorskaya Line between Zvenigorodskaya and Volkovskaya, which at that time had only two stations. The line was extended to Komendantsky Prospekt on March 7, 2009, by adding the branch that was attached to the Pravoberezhnaya Line in the 1990s due to delays on the Frunzensko-Primorskaya Line. On December 30, 2010, Obvodny Kanal station opened between Volkovskaya and Zvenigorodskaya. In December 2012 the southeastern extension to Bukharestskaya and Mezhdunarodnaya was opened, and Volkovskaya ceased to be the terminus.

== Transport ==
Buses: 54, 57, 74, 91, 117, 856. Trams: 25, 49.

== See also ==
- Volkovskaya railway station
