= Sadovaya (Saint Petersburg Metro) =

Saint Petersburg Metro Station

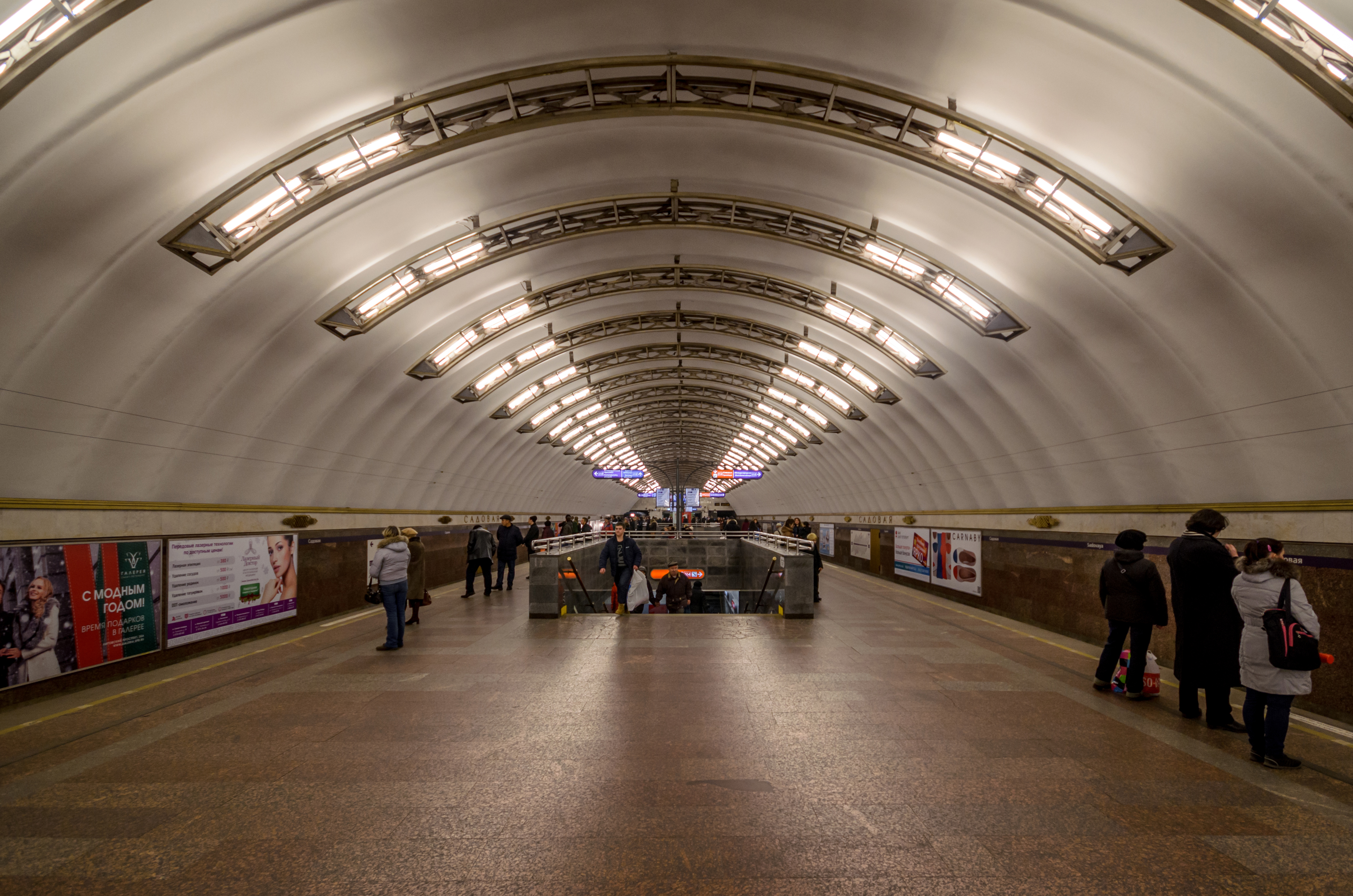
- Station Hall

General information
- Location: 6, Sadovaya street, Tsentralny District; Saint Petersburg; Russia
- Coordinates: 59.926667°N 30.3185°E
- System: Saint Petersburg Metro station
- Operator: Saint Petersburg Metro
- Line: Frunzensko–Primorskaya Line
- Platforms: 1 (Island platform)
- Tracks: 2

Construction
- Structure type: Underground
- Depth: ≈71 metres (233 ft)

History
- Opened: 30 December 1991
- Electrified: 825 V DC low third rail

Services
Preceding station	Saint Petersburg Metro	Following station
Admiralteyskaya towards Komendantsky Prospekt	Line 5	Zvenigorodskaya towards Shushary
Terminus	Line 4 transfer at Spasskaya	Dostoyevskaya towards Ulitsa Dybenko
Nevsky Prospekt towards Parnas	Line 2 transfer at Sennaya Ploshchad	Tekhnologichesky Institut towards Kupchino
Route map
Location

Sadovaya (Russian: Садовая) is a station on the Frunzensko-Primorskaya Line of Saint Petersburg Metro, opened on 30 December 1991. It provides a transfer to the Pravoberezhnaya line through Spasskaya and the Moskovsko-Petrogradskaya line through Sennaya Ploshchad. It is the metro station best for going to Malaya Sadovaya.

== Transport ==
Buses: 49, 50, 70, 71, 181, 262. Trams: 3.
