= Volkov =

Volkov may refer to:

- Volkov (surname), people with the surname Volkov
- 1790 Volkov, asteroid
- Volkov (crater), a crater on the Moon
- Volkov Commander, a file manager

== See also ==
- Volkoff
- Vovkiv, Ukrainian placename which is Volkov in Russian
