= Staraya Derevnya (Saint Petersburg Metro) =

Saint Petersburg Metro Station

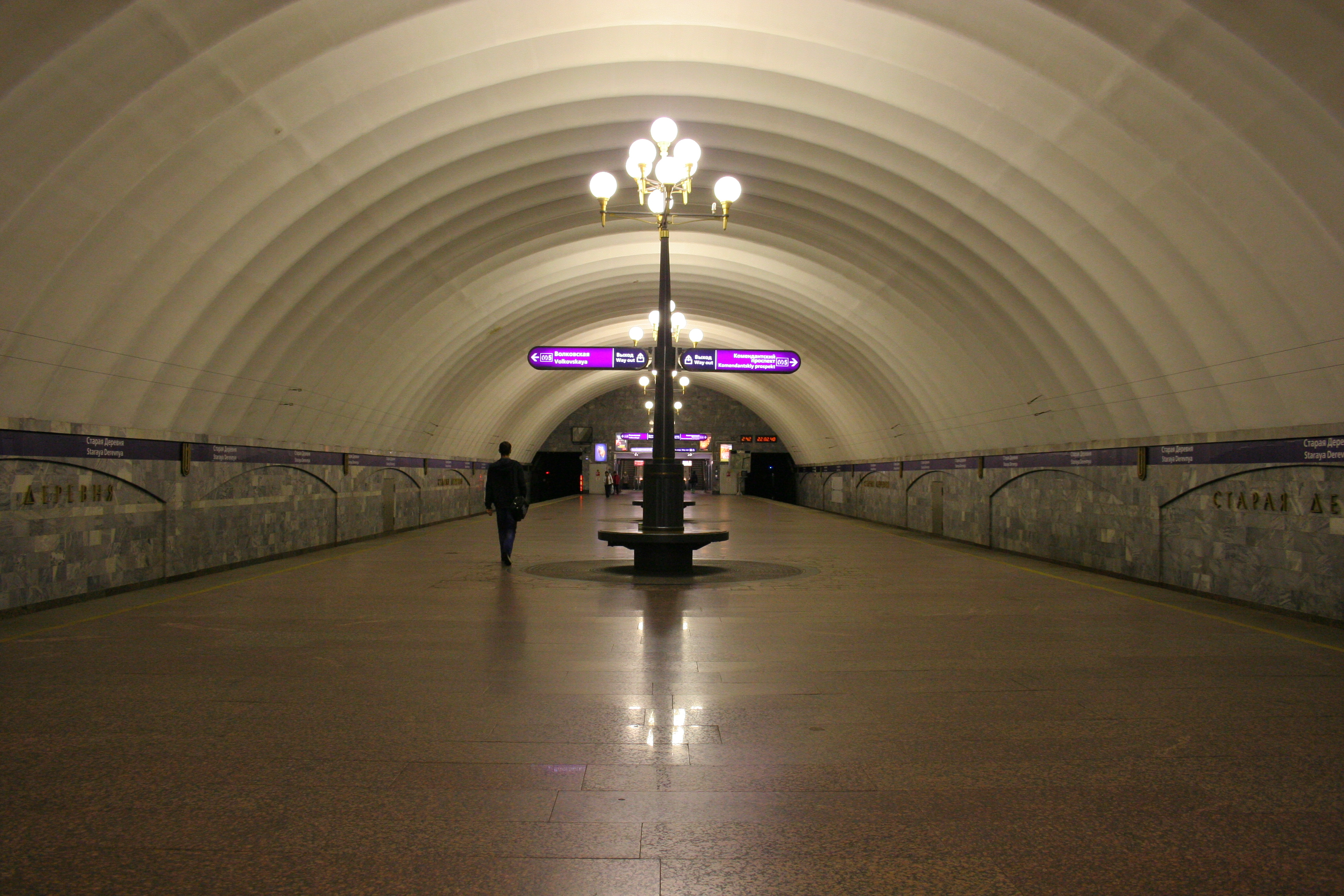
- Station Hall

General information
- Location: Primorsky District; Saint Petersburg; Russia
- Coordinates: 59.989611°N 30.255111°E
- System: Saint Petersburg Metro station
- Operator: Saint Petersburg Metro
- Line: Frunzensko–Primorskaya Line
- Platforms: 1 (Island platform)
- Tracks: 2

Construction
- Structure type: Underground
- Depth: ≈61 m (200 ft)
- Parking: Yes
- Cycle facilities: Yes

History
- Opened: January 14, 1999
- Electrified: 825 V DC low third rail

Services
Preceding station	Saint Petersburg Metro	Following station
Komendantsky Prospekt Terminus	Line 5	Krestovsky Ostrov towards Shushary
Route map
Location

Staraya Derevnya (Russian: Старая Деревня) (literally translate - Old Village) is a station on the Frunzensko-Primorskaya Line of Saint Petersburg Metro, opened on January 14, 1999.

== Transport ==
Buses: 93, 101A, 101Э, 112, 125, 126, 154, 154A, 166, 216A, 217, 223, 235, 258, 279, 294. Trolleybuses: 23, 25, 40. Trams: 18.
