= Line 5 (Saint Petersburg Metro) =

Saint Petersburg Metro line

Line 5 (Frunzensko-Primorskaya)

Overview
- Status: Operational
- Owner: Saint Petersburg Metro
- Termini: Komendantsky Prospekt; Shushary
- Stations: 15

Service
- Type: Rapid transit
- System: Saint Petersburg Metro

History
- Opened: 1997/2008
- Last extension: 2019

Technical
- Line length: 26.2 km (16.3 mi)
- Track gauge: 1,524 mm (5 ft)

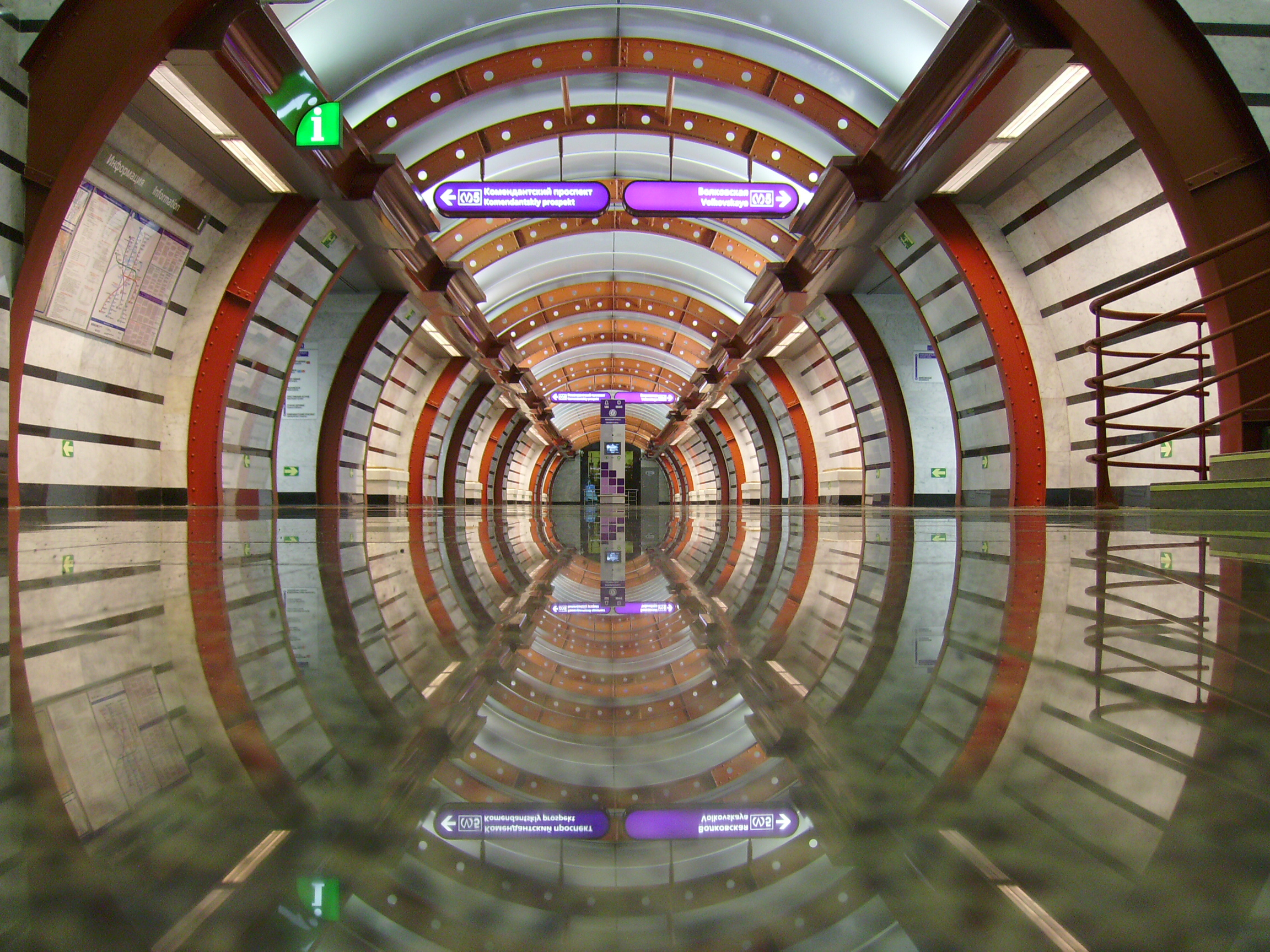
Obvodny Kanal station

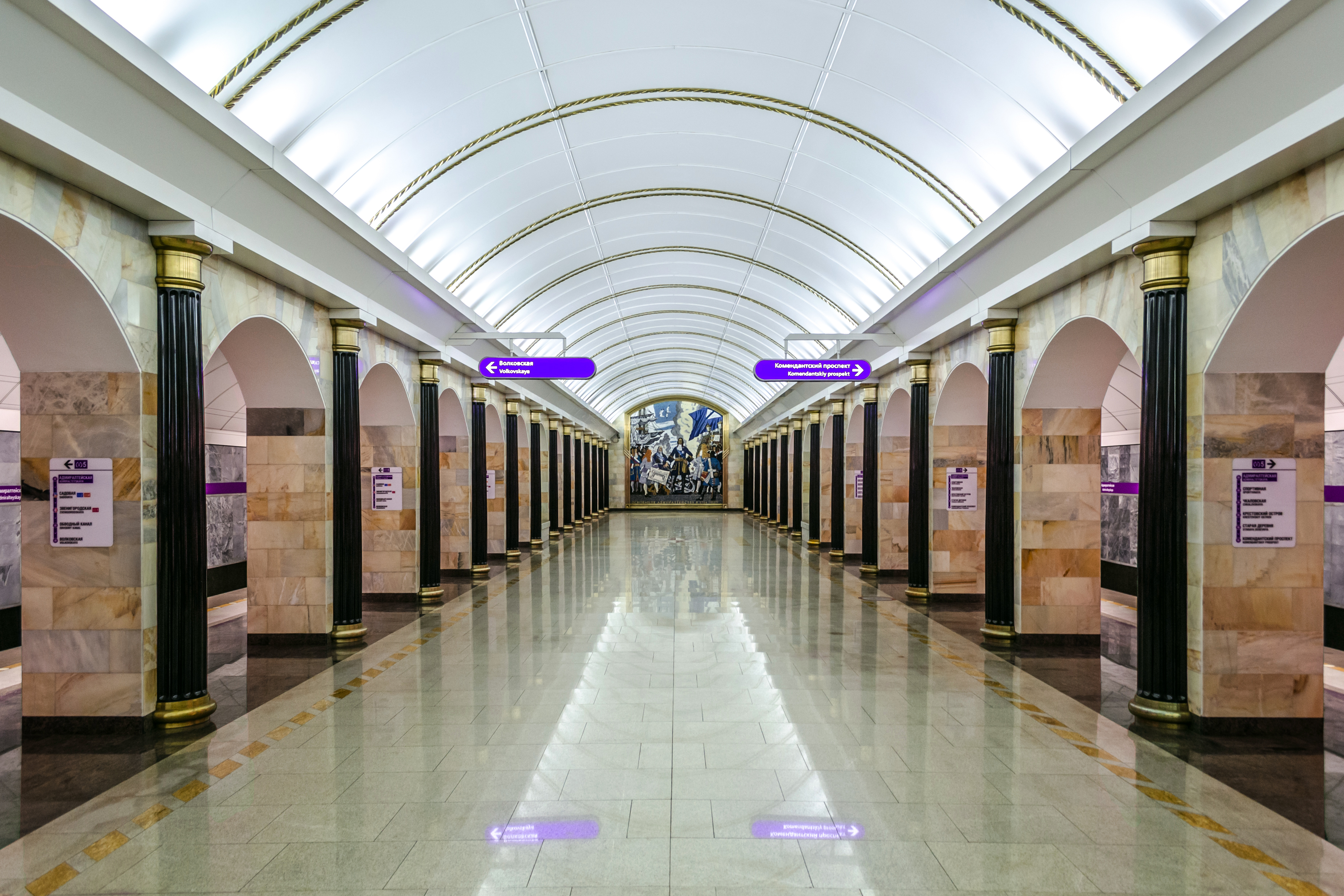
Admiralteyskaya station

Line 5 of the Saint Petersburg Metro, also known as Frunzensko-Primorskaya Line (Russian: Фру́нзенско-Примо́рская ли́ния) or Purple Line, is a rapid transit line in Saint Petersburg, Russia, opened in 2008, which connects the historical city centre to the northwestern and southern districts. It has 15 stations covering a total length of 26.2 kilometres (16.3 mi). Although it opened on 20 December 2008, parts of the line are considerably older. At its official opening in 2008, it included only two stations that opened concurrently with the line. On 7 March 2009, the Metro incorporated six existing stations of Line 4 (Pravoberezhnaya) into Line 5, expanding it to nine stations.

Admiralteyskaya station, which is the deepest station in Russia and one of the deepest in the world, at 86 metres, opened on this line 2011.

The line is named after the Primorsky district and Frunzensky district.

== History ==
=== History of construction ===
Expansion plans that included the route of the current Line 5 first appeared in the 1980s. Construction began in 1987, but the collapse of the Soviet Union and the resultant financial crash forced the city to freeze the construction of the Frunzensky branch (the section south of Sadovaya). Sadovaya, which opened in 1991, is the oldest station on the line.

City officials decided to continue building the Primorsky branch (the section north of Sadovaya). Sportivnaya and Chkalovskaya opened in 1997, Staraya Derevnya and Krestovsky Ostrov opened in 1999, and Komendantsky Prospekt opened in 2005. The Metro incorporated these stations into the Line 4 (Pravoberezhnaya) once the Frunzensky branch was completed.

Subsequent to the formal opening of Line 5, and the connection of the Primorsky and Fruzensky branches in March 2009, Obvodny Kanal station was opened on the existing open section of line on 30 December 2010. The long-awaited Admiralteyskaya station, serving many of the historic and tourist sites in the city, was opened on 28 December 2011, also on an existing open section of line. Prior to this date, most trains bypassed this partially completed station, save for a few trains that dropped off and picked up construction workers.

== Rolling Stock ==
The line currently has trains of 81-540/541 and the .2 and .5 modifications running since the opening.

=== Timeline ===
Segment	Launch date	Length	Number of stations
Sadovaya as a part of line 4	30 December 1991	N/A	1
Sadovaya to Chkalovskaya (without Admiralteyskaya) as a part of line 4	15 September 1997	4.7 km (2.9 mi)	2
Chkalovskaya to Staraya Derevnya (without Krestovsky Ostrov station) as a part of line 4	14 January 1999	4.1 km (2.5 mi)	1
Krestovsky Ostrov as a part of Line 4	3 September 1999	N/A	1
Staraya Derevnya to Komendantsky Prospekt as a part of line 4	2 April 2005	2.7 km (1.7 mi)	1
Zvenigorodskaya to Volkovskaya (without Obvodny Kanal station)	20 December 2008	3.2 km (2.0 mi)	2
Sadovaya to Zvenigorodskaya, Primorsky and Frunsensky radiuses are joined together.	7 March 2009	1.1 km (0.68 mi)	N/A
Obvodny Kanal	30 December 2010	N/A	1
Admiralteyskaya	28 December 2011	N/A	1
Volkovskaya to Mezhdunarodnaya	28 December 2012	5.0 km (3.1 mi)	2
Mezhdunarodnaya to Shushary	3 October 2019	5.23 km (3.25 mi)	3
Total:		26.2 km (16.3 mi)	15

== Future projects ==
On the northern end of the line, three stations are planned namely Shuvalovsky Prospekt, Plesetskaya, Artseulovskaya and Kolomyazhskaya. They will be followed by another new depot. Once completed, the line will have 19 stations, and will be in excess of 30 kilometres (19 mi) long.
