= Volkovsky (rural locality) =

Volkovsky (Russian: Волковский; masculine), Volkovskaya (Волковская; feminine), or Volkovskoye (Волковское; neuter) is the name of several rural localities in Russia:

- Volkovsky, Chelyabinsk Oblast, a settlement in Stepnoy Selsoviet of Verkhneuralsky District of Chelyabinsk Oblast
- Volkovsky, Novosibirsk Oblast, a settlement in Chulymsky District of Novosibirsk Oblast
- Volkovskoye (rural locality), a selo in Tarussky District of Kaluga Oblast
- Volkovskaya (rural locality), a village in Toropetsky District of Tver Oblast
