= Komendantsky Prospekt (Saint Petersburg Metro) =

Saint Petersburg Metro Station

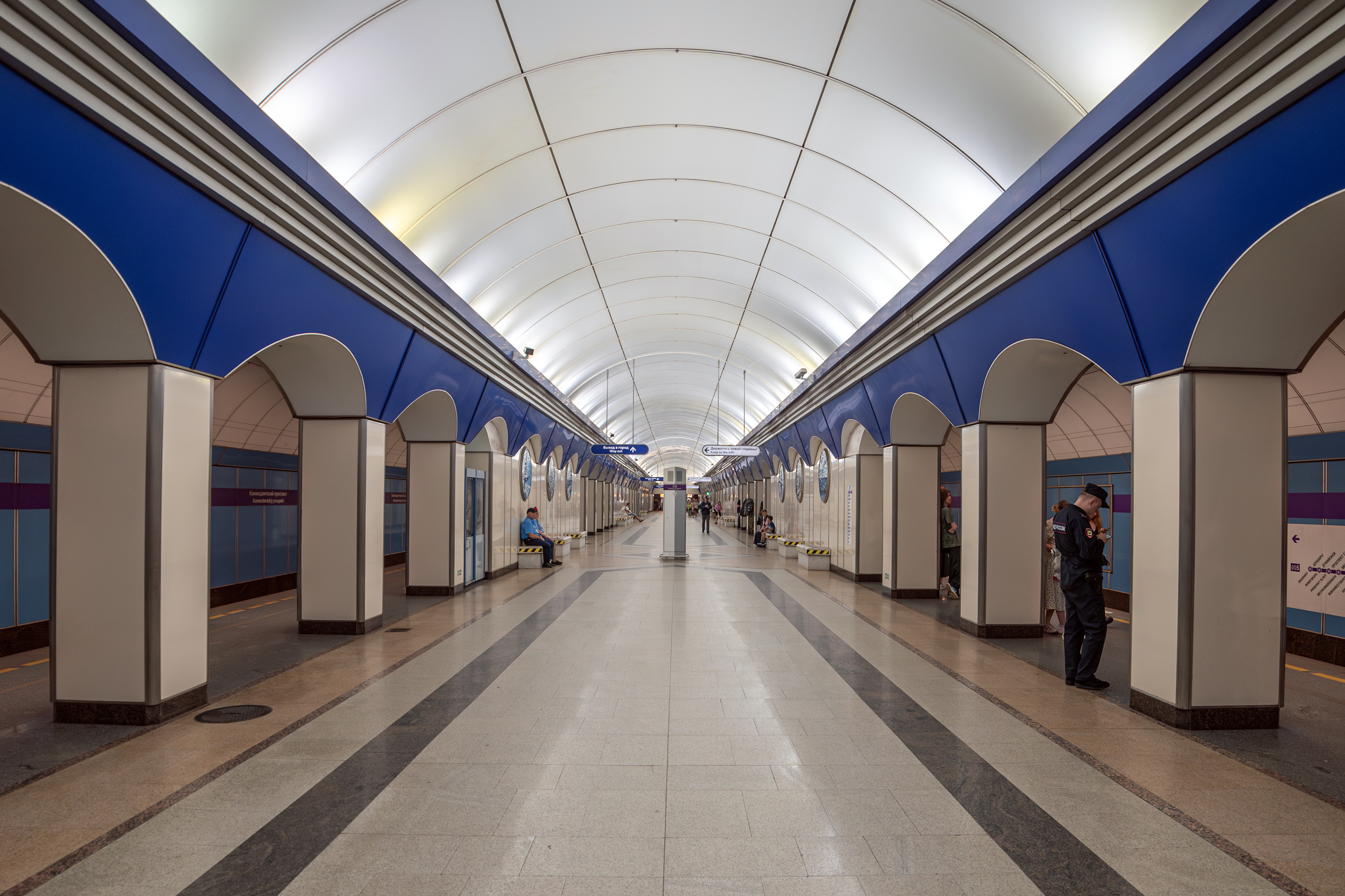
- Station Hall

General information
- Location: Primorsky District; Saint Petersburg; Russia
- Coordinates: 60.009978°N 30.256975°E
- System: Saint Petersburg Metro station
- Operator: Saint Petersburg Metro
- Line: Frunzensko–Primorskaya Line
- Platforms: 1 (Island platform)
- Tracks: 2

Construction
- Structure type: Underground
- Parking: No
- Cycle facilities: Yes

History
- Opened: April 2, 2005
- Electrified: 825 V DC low third rail

Services
Preceding station	Saint Petersburg Metro	Following station
Terminus	Line 5	Staraya Derevnya towards Shushary
Route map
Location

Komendantsky Prospekt (Russian: Комендантский проспект, literal translation: Avenue of Commandants) is a station on the Frunzensko-Primorskaya Line of the Saint Petersburg Metro, opened on April 2, 2005. Its main decoration theme depicts the early years of Russian aviation, due to the location of the station at a former aviation field. It is the newest fourth metro station of the over-populated Primorsky district of Saint Petersburg, along with Pionerskaya and Chornaya Rechka stations of the Moskovsko-Petrogradskaya line and Staraya Derevnya of the Frunzensko-Primorskaya line.

== Transport ==
Buses: 112, 125, 126, 127, 127M, 134Б, 135, 170, 171, 172, 180, 182, 194, 223, 235, 258, 279, 294. Trolleybuses: 2, 23, 25, 50. Trams: 47, 55.
