= Heritage streetcar =

Public transportation method utilizing old rolling stock

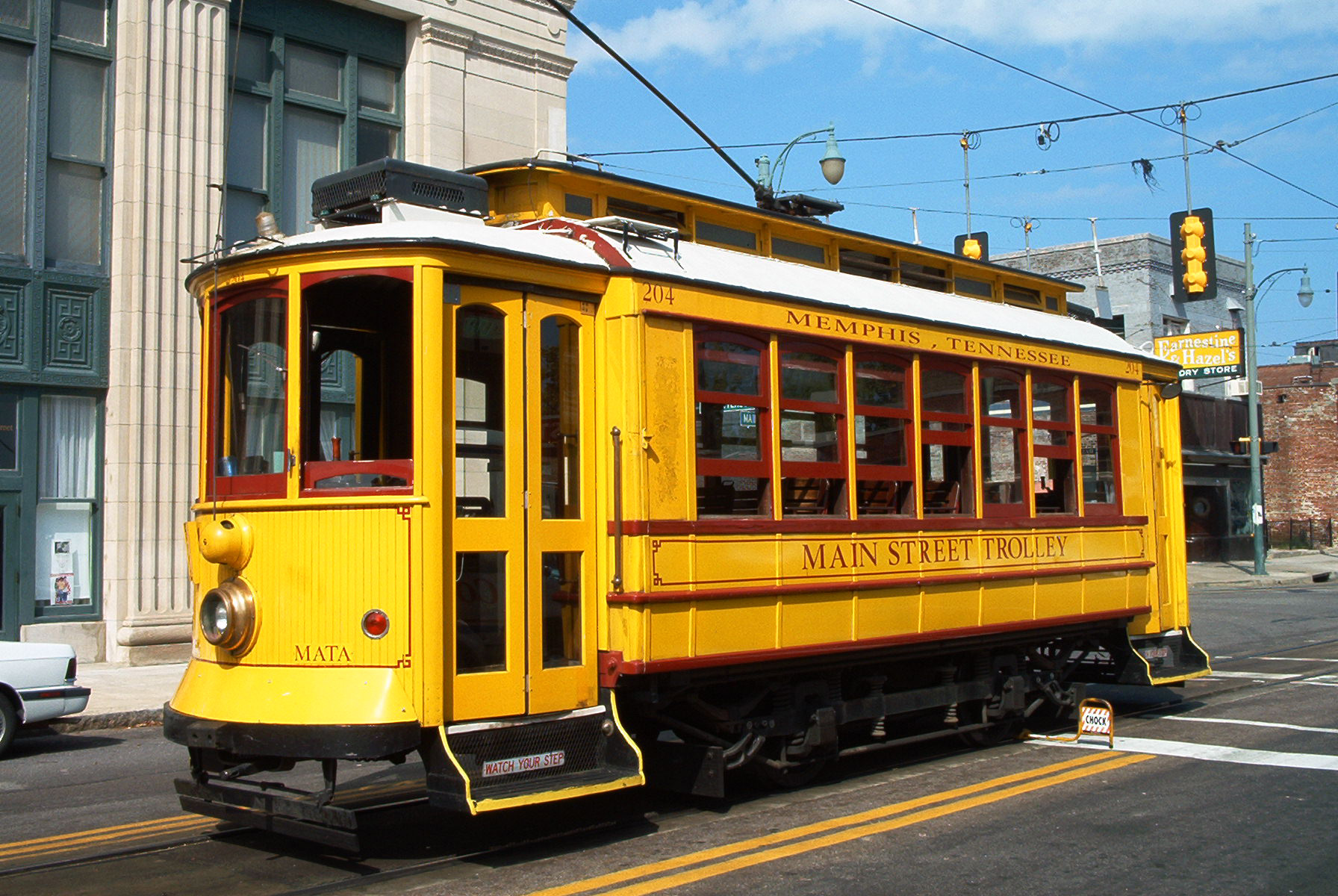
A former Porto trolley in Memphis, Tennessee, United States

Heritage streetcars (also known as heritage trams or nostalgic trams) are a part of the efforts to preserve rail transit heritage. In addition to preserving street-running rail vehicles, heritage streetcar operations can include upkeep of historic rail infrastructure. Working heritage streetcars are closely related to the growing global heritage railway movement and form a part of the living history of rail transport.

The vehicles are called streetcars or trolleys in North America and trams or tramcars elsewhere. The first two terms are often used interchangeably in the United States, with trolley being preferred in the eastern US and streetcar in Canada and the western US. In parts of the United States, internally powered buses made to resemble a streetcar are often referred to as "trolleys". To avoid further confusion with trolley buses, the American Public Transportation Association (APTA) refers to them as "trolley-replica buses".

Museums, heritage tram line operators, and amateur enthusiasts can preserve original vintage vehicles or create replicas of historic vehicles to re-create or preserve streetcar technology of the past. Heritage vehicles that are kept fully functional can be used on heritage tramlines or for charter traffic.

== Europe ==
=== Austria ===
The Remise Museum (Depot Museum, or Carbarn Museum) in Vienna, opened in 2014, covers the history of public transport in the city of Vienna and offers an extensive tram collection to visitors.

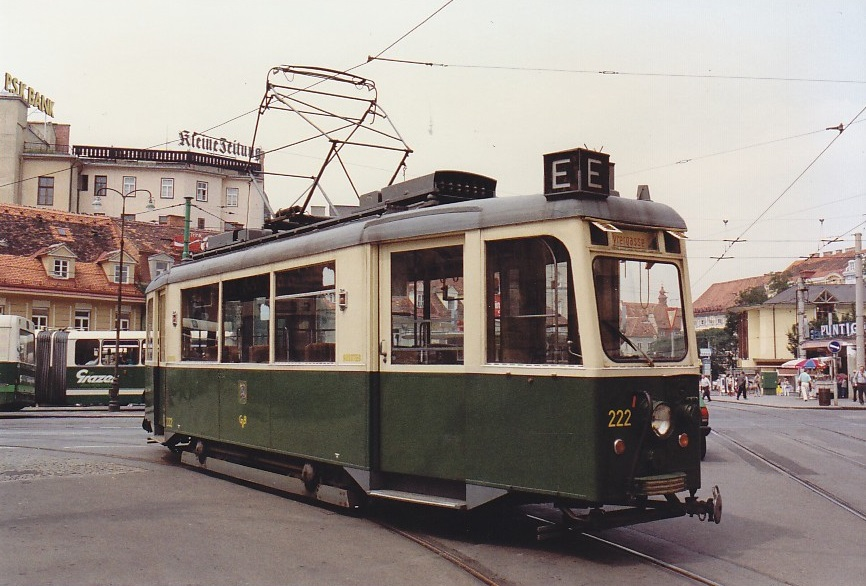
Graz two-axle tram No. 222 Graz

The Styrian municipality centre Graz has a tram museum since 1971 located in the depot of Mariatrost. Another heritage tramway operates in Styria between the railway station of Mariazell and the nearby Erlaufsee, mainly using ex-Vienna streetcars. This line was recently electrified on longer sections and also extended towards the city center.

In Innsbruck, a collection of the city's historic trams is preserved and renovated – together with other Tyrolean railway vehicles – by the association Tiroler MuseumsBahnen, which has its museum in the old station of the Stubaitalbahn.

=== Belgium ===
In Belgium, there are three tram museums, one in Brussels – organizing several weekend rides to Tervueren and around the city – and other in Antwerp. The 70-kilometre long (43 mi) Kusttram (the coastal line between Knokke and De Panne via Ostend) features also some vehicles of the once-extensive interurban network, housed in the depots at De Panne and Knokke.

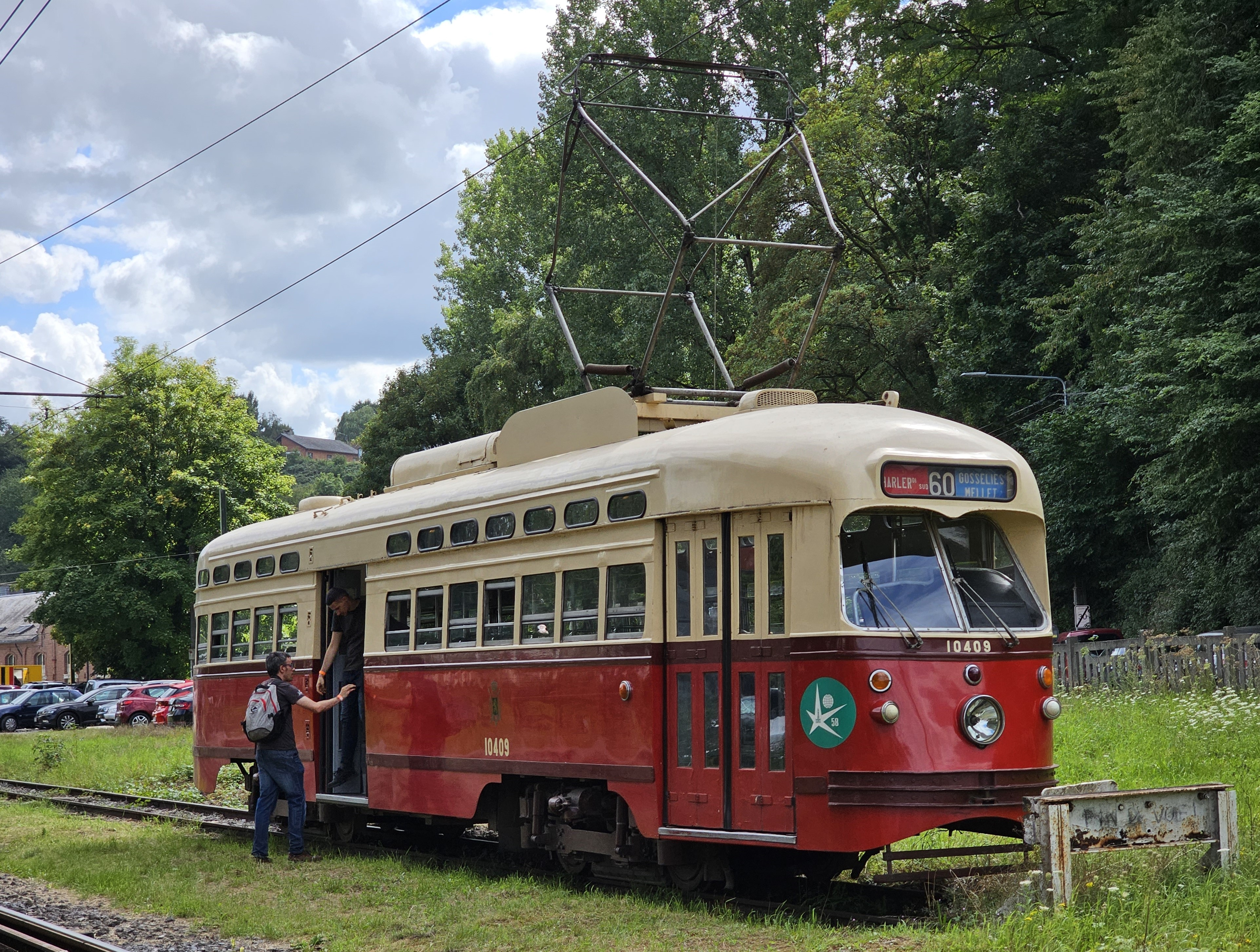
ASVi: PCC type tram 10409.

ASVi run a museum in Thuin and an 8 km (5 mi) line with electric and diesel cars on a part of the once SNCV line 92 and on a part on the once SNCB line 109 after regauging to 1,000 mm (3 ft 3 3/8 in) metre gauge.

=== Bulgaria ===
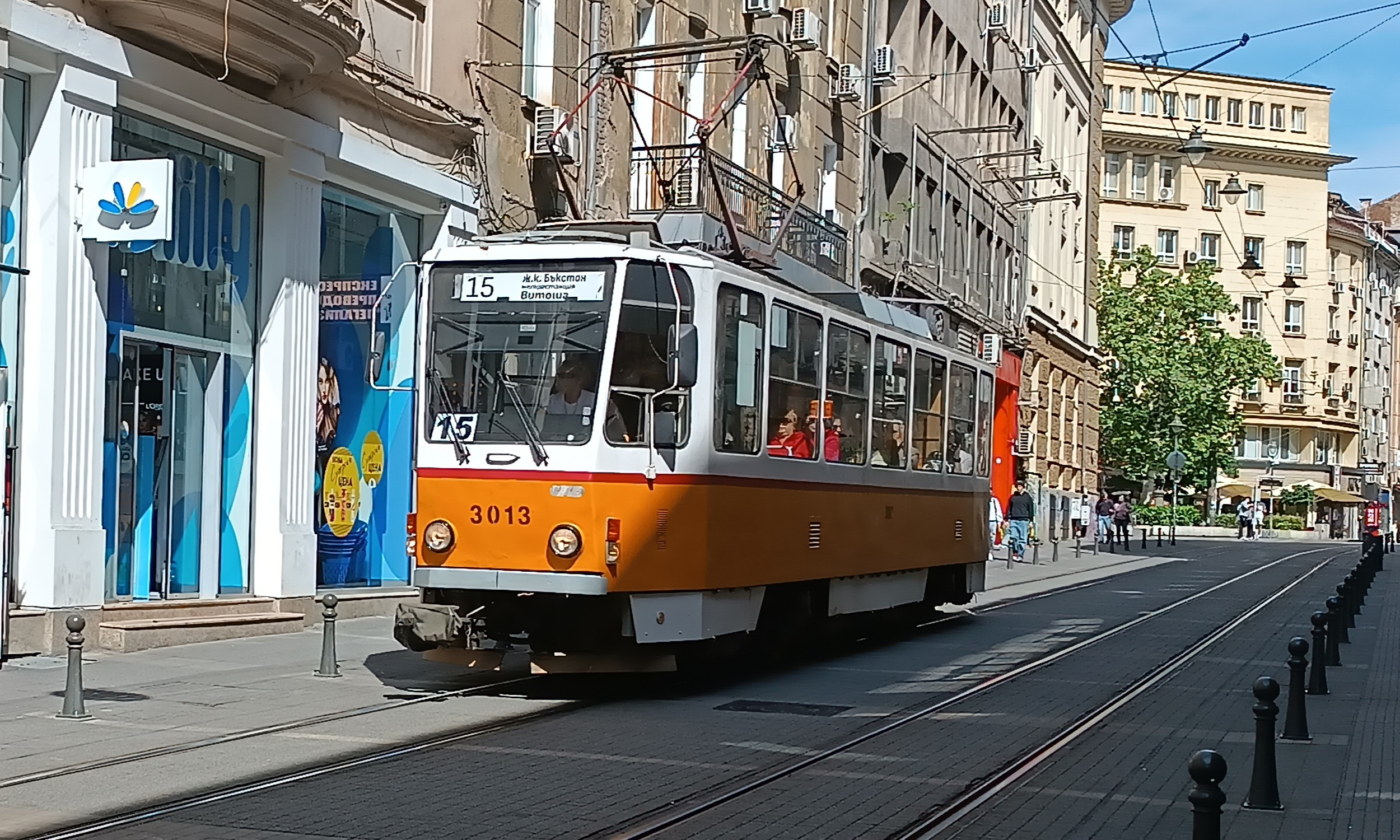
Tatra T6A2, Sofia tram No. 3013

In Sofia, heritage trams are operated. Occaisionally, stage plays are performed, including stand-up comedy and stage plays for children. Additionally, late 2024 a tourist information point was opened in former tramcar 83.

=== Czech Republic ===
In Prague, the Prague Integrated Transport operates Historical Tram Line No. 41 at weekends using historical Ringhoffer tram vehicles and a week-long operating Nostalgic Tram Line No. 23 using older PCC-based ČKD Tatra T3 and uniquely a T6A5.

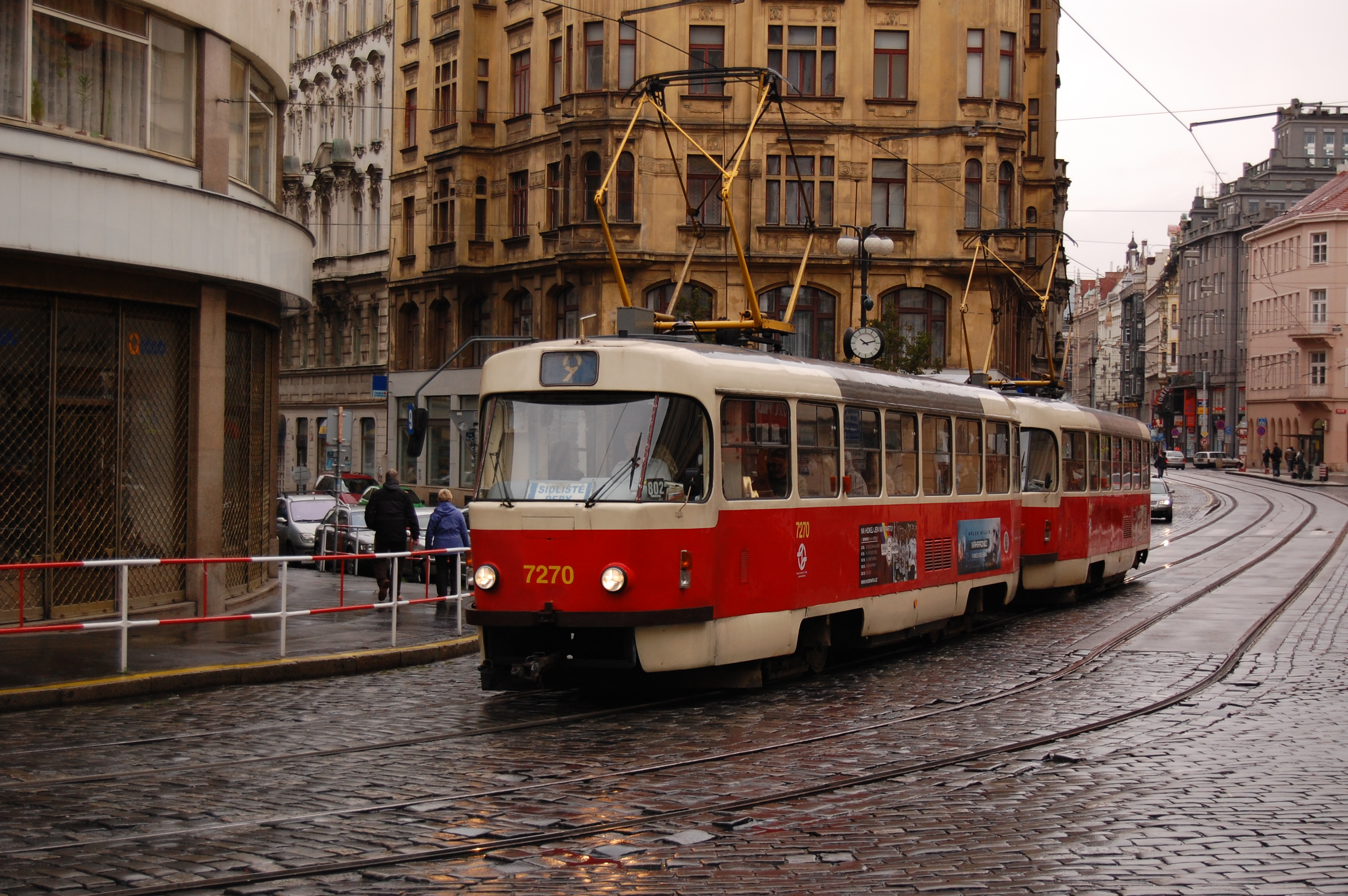
Prague tram No. 7270

Historical trams are also seasonally operated on the Brno tram system.

=== Denmark ===
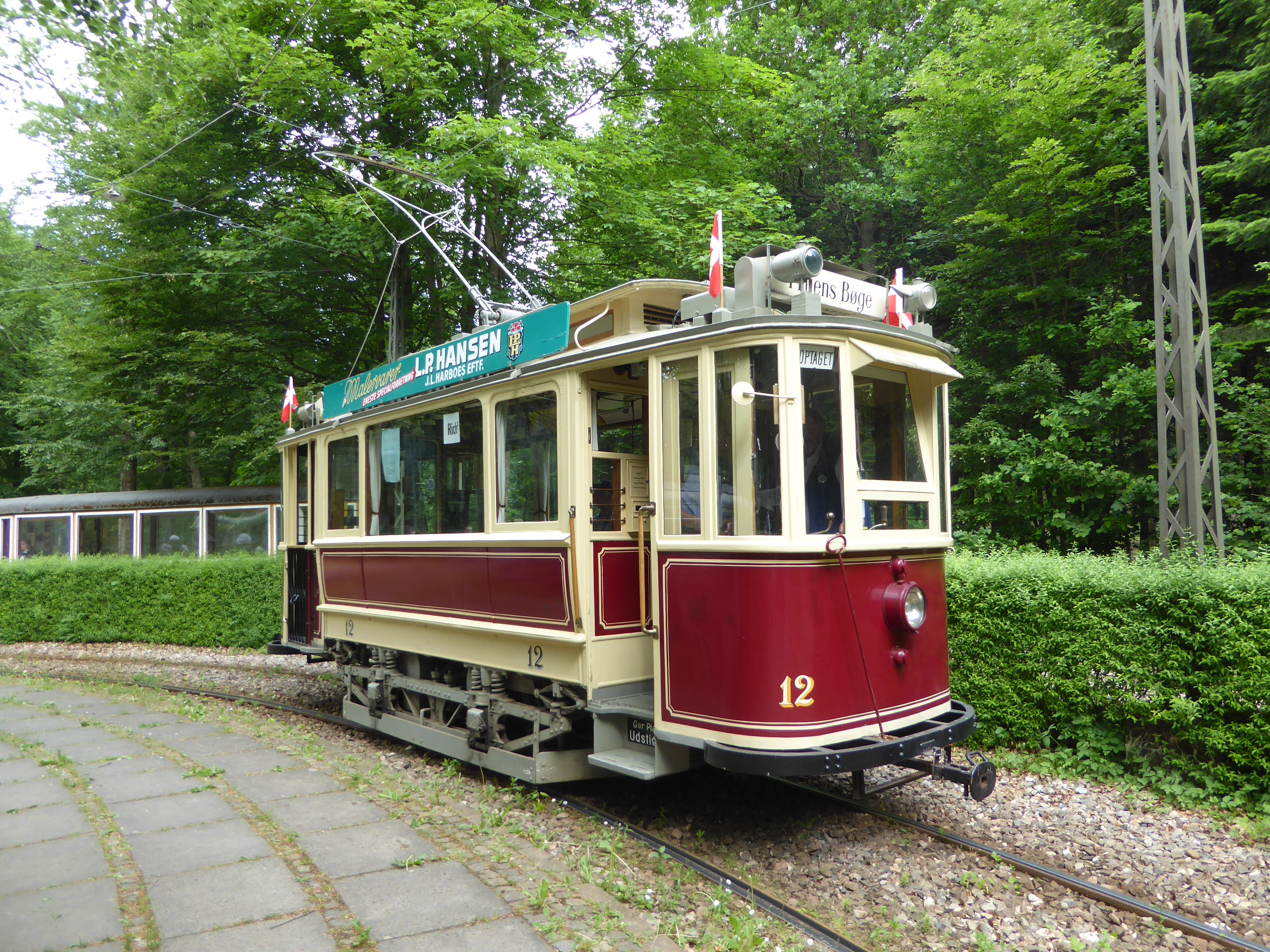
Skjoldenæsholm OS No. 12

In Ringsted, the museum opened on land which belongs to Skjoldenæsholm Castle on 26 May 1978. the Danish Tramway Museum, is an open-air museum dedicated to vintage trams.

=== Estonia ===
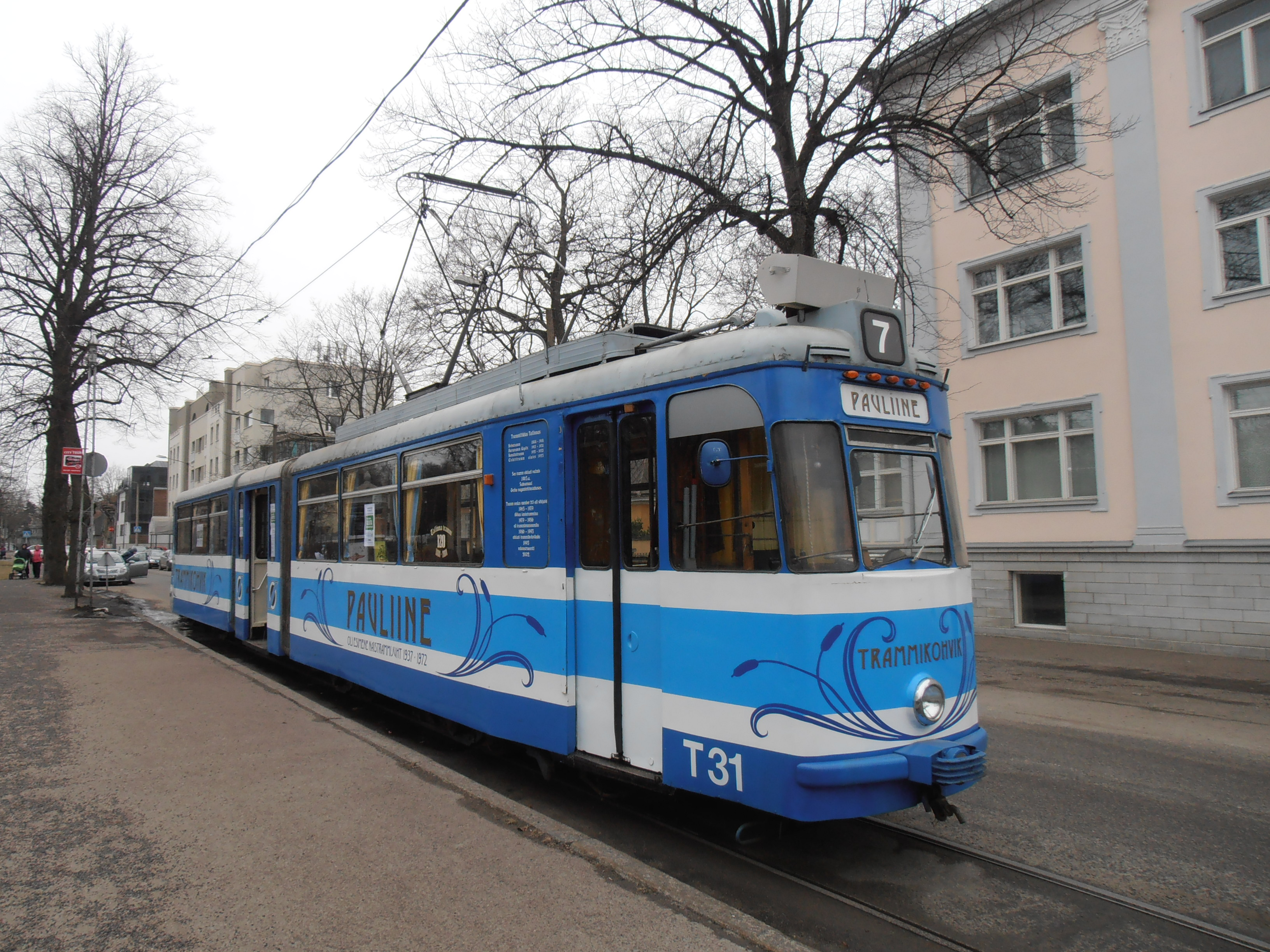
Tram No. T31 1967 Gotha - Tallinn

In Tallinn, renovated heritage trams have been in public use since 2017.

=== Finland ===
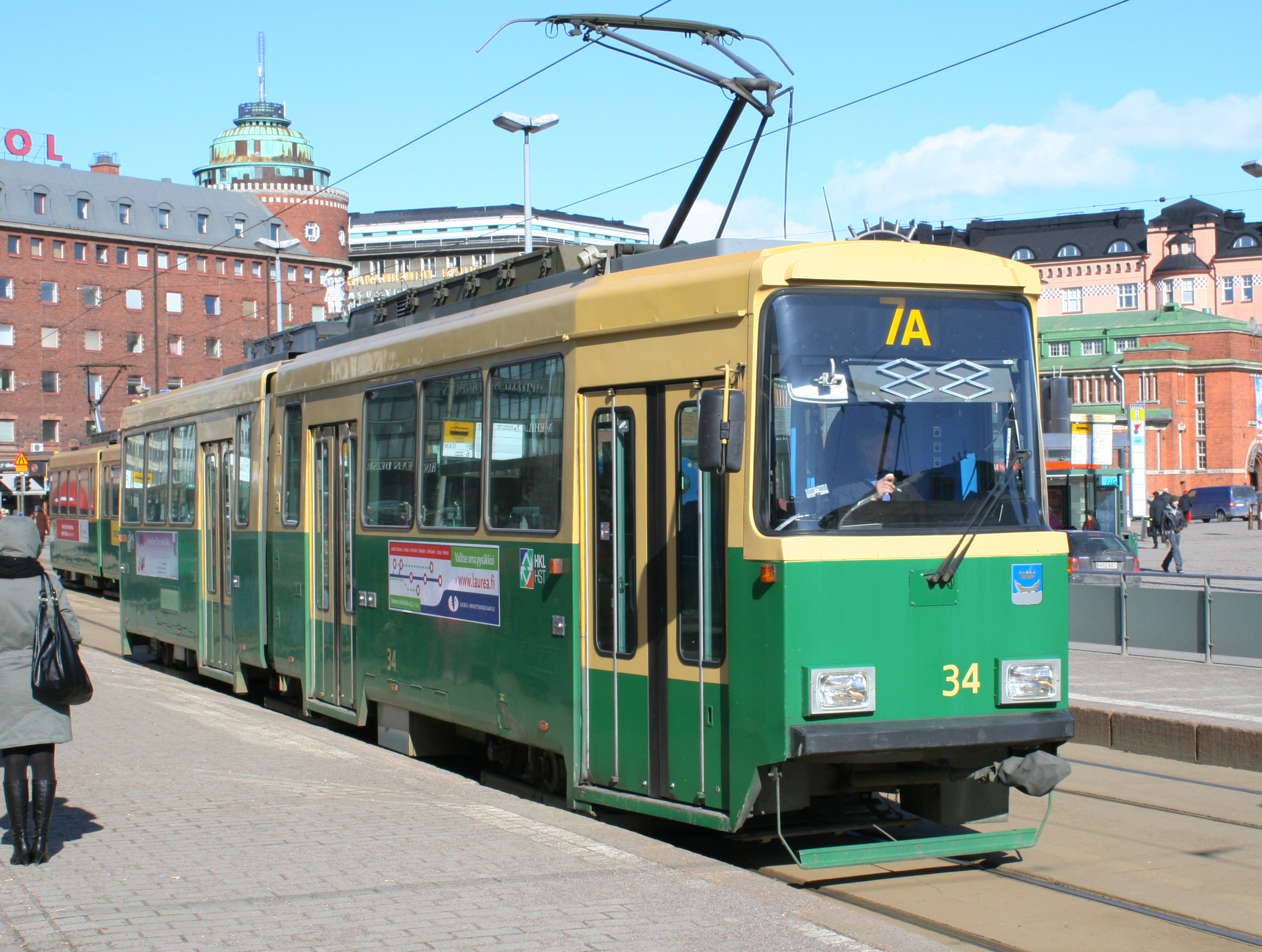
A Valmet Nr I-class tram No. 34 in Helsinki.

In Helsinki, Oy Stadin Ratikat Ab offers charter (private-hire) tram rides with vintage cars and in summer months operates an in-street heritage tram line on the Helsinki tram network.

=== France ===
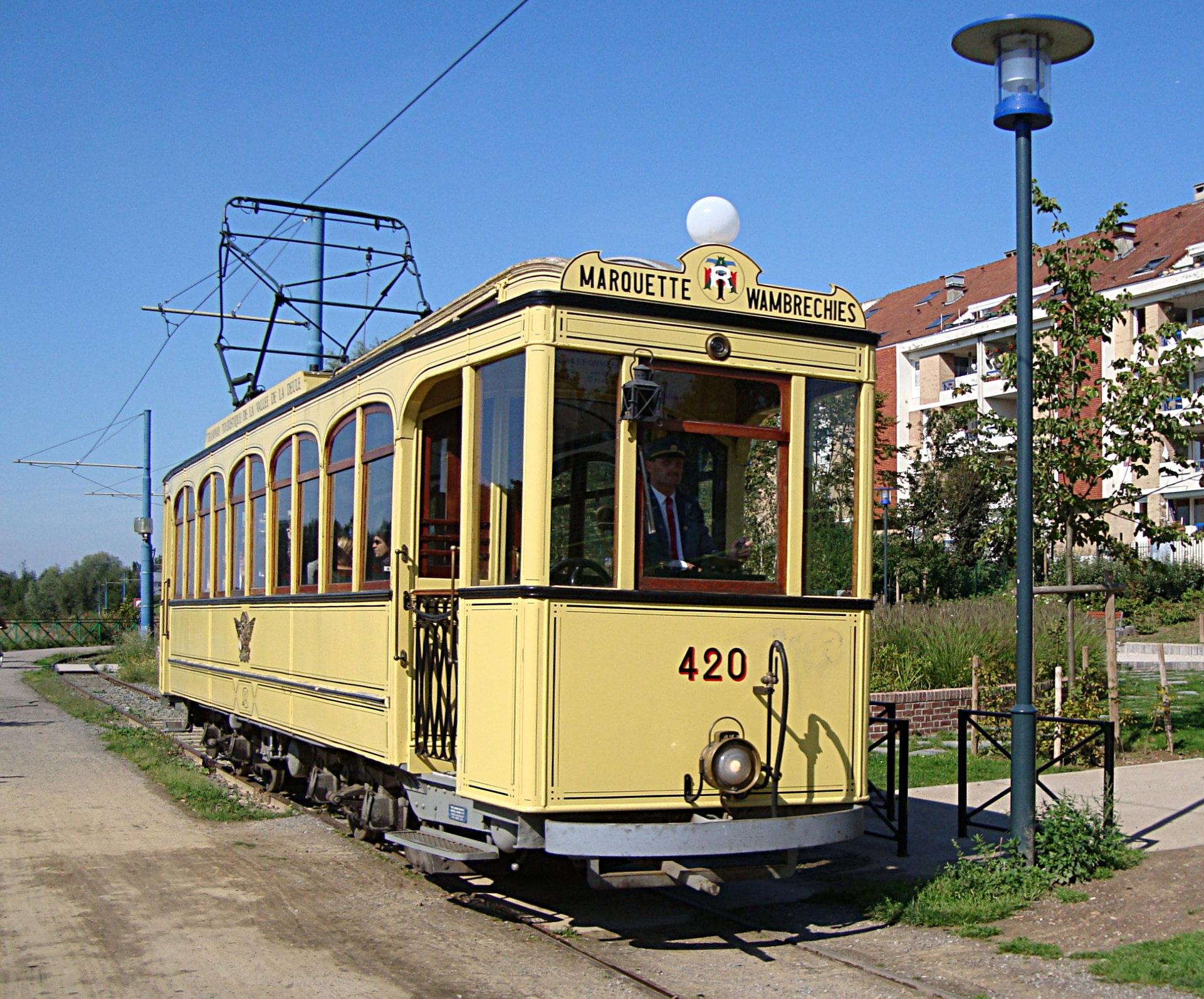
Deûle Valley tourist tram No. 420 in Lille

In France, the Deûle Valley tramway near Lille which runs along a 3 km (1.9 mi) track from Marquette-lez-Lille to Wambrechies features several tram vehicles dating back to the beginning of the 20th century.

=== Germany ===
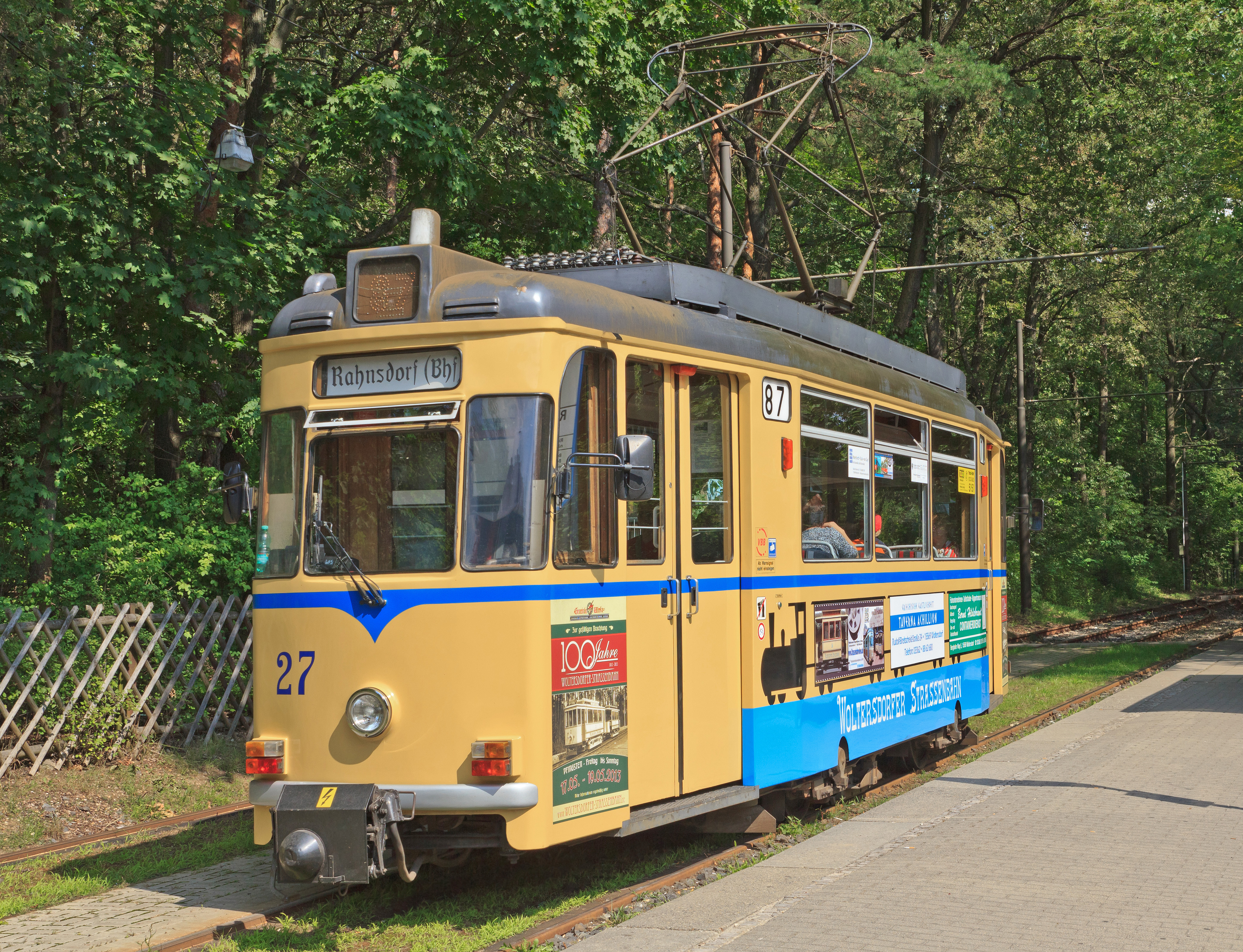
Woltersdorf tram No. 27 in Rahnsdorf

Woltersdorf Tramway located in Woltersdorf, Brandenburg, near Berlin, Germany. The line opened in 1913. In the 21st century, it is one of the smallest surviving town tram operators in Germany. The Naumburg tramway, opened in 1907, closed as a regular public transport service in 1991 but reopened in 1995 as a heritage tramway with limited operation over a short section of the former route.

=== Hungary ===
In Hungary all of the four tram systems (Budapest, Debrecen, Miskolc, Szeged) have operating heritage trams.

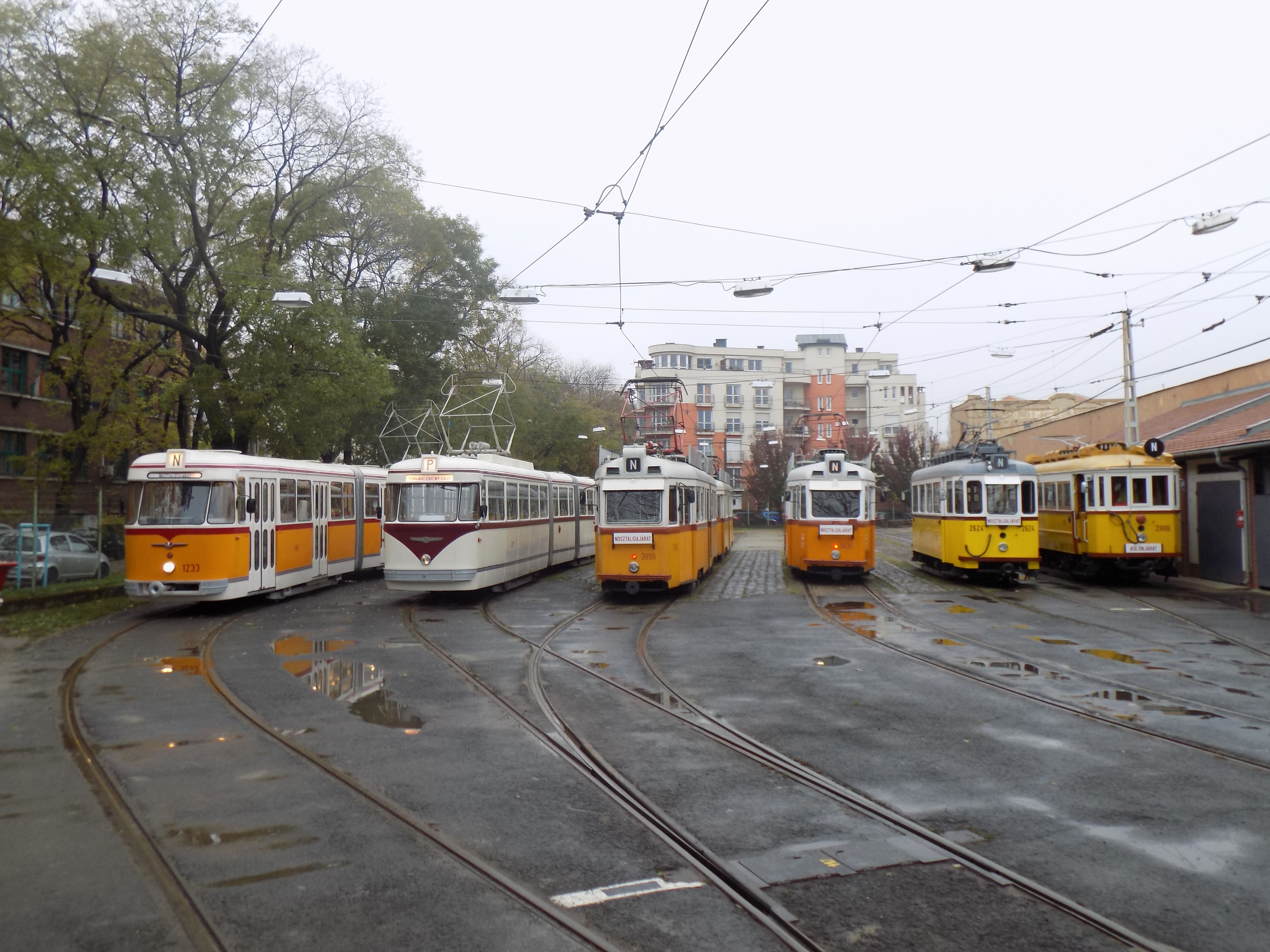
A few vintage trams in Budapest

In Budapest, heritage trams first operated in 1987. Its fleet contains quite a few preserved public transport vehicles (trams, buses, trolleybuses, even metro cars) spanning from the late 19th century until recent years, and there are more waiting to be repaired. Heritage services are mainly operated from April/May to September/October on weekends. There are both heritage and retro lines. The retro lines can be used with normal (seasonal) tickets, however, on heritage lines other, heritage (seasonal) tickets are needed. In 2019 there are two heritage tram lines; one retro tram line, one heritage bus line and one retro bus line operated regularly. Occasionally there are other lines in operation. There is also one vintage tram line - tram line 1956 - operating once-a-year in late October as a memorial to the Hungarian Revolution of 1956; it can be used with normal (seasonal) tickets.

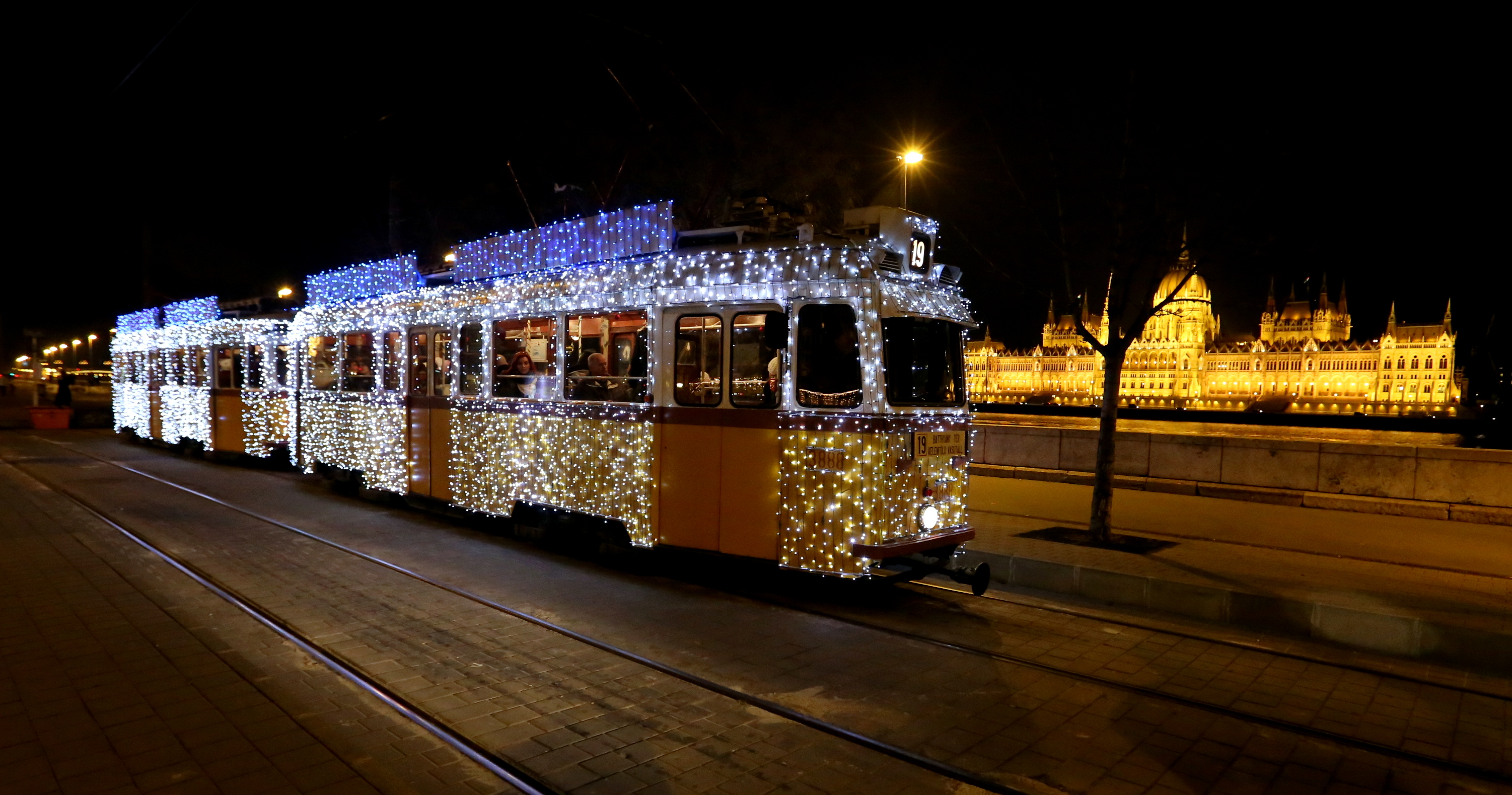
Heritage lights tram in Budapest

In Debrecen, there are also a few vintage trams. They are operated less regularly, mostly on certain occasions.

In Miskolc, there are also a few vintage trams and buses. They are operated less regularly, mostly on certain occasions.

In Szeged, there are also a few vintage trams, buses and trolleybuses. Trams are in service on certain summer weekends. Otherwise, they are operated less regularly, mostly on certain occasions.

For about a one-month period near Christmas, each city operates lighted trams (trams that are decorated with LED strips and/or Christmas decoration). These trams operate on various lines around the cities in the late afternoons, evenings, and can be used by normal (seasonal) tickets usually. At the same time each of these cities, except Miskolc, light trolleybuses are operated in the same way as trams.

=== Italy ===
Turin operates the historical route 7, a two-way circular route around the town centre. Turin was the first town in Italy with tram lines served solely by historical trams. The inauguration of the heritage tramway took place during the celebrations of the 150th anniversary of national unity, in March 2011.

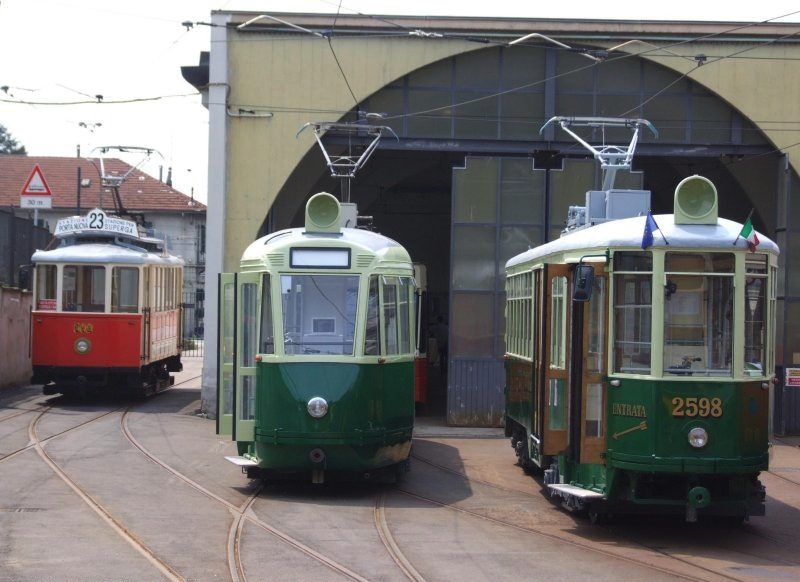
Turin historic tram 2598 at the depot

In the nearby metropolis of Milan, the continued, extensive use of the "Series 1500 tram" (Peter Witt streetcar) dating from 1928 to 1930 is an example of a heritage tram use that is so widespread across the system and blends into everyday urban life in the city to such an extent that it is not regarded as historic or heritage operation.

=== Netherlands ===
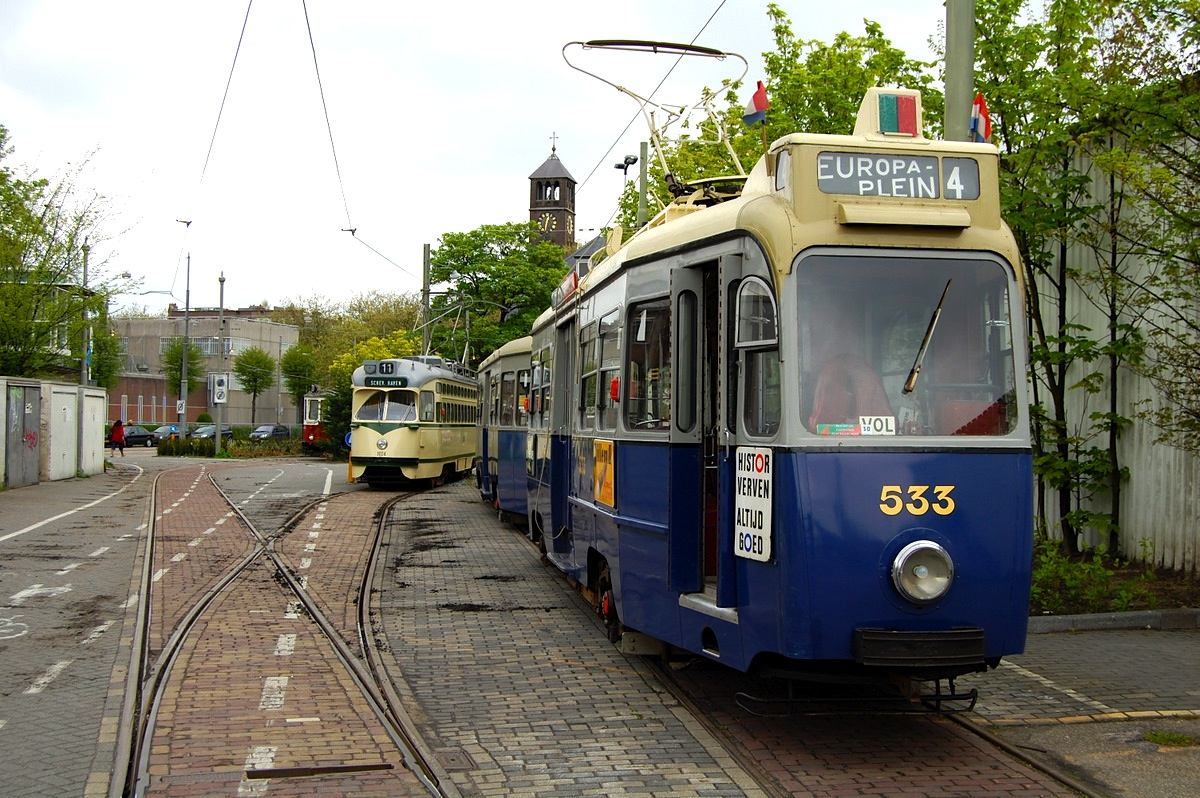
Amsterdam three-axle trams Nos. 533 & 987

In the Netherlands, historic trams are preserved and operated in several cities. In Amsterdam, Rotterdam, and The Hague, dedicated organisations maintain operational heritage vehicles running on regular tram tracks through the city. Besides a trammuseam, The Hague also has a tourist tram service, operating on weekends during the summer months. The service uses original PPC trams built between 1957 and 1971.

Additionally, the Netherlands Open Air Museum in Arnhem operates historic trams originally from Rotterdam mostly as a park transport system, allowing visitors to hop on and off to explore different parts of the museum. The heritage tram itself is a popular attraction, showcasing Dutch transport history.

=== Norway ===
In Bergen the Bergens Elektriske Sporvei has operated a short heritage tramway since 1993.

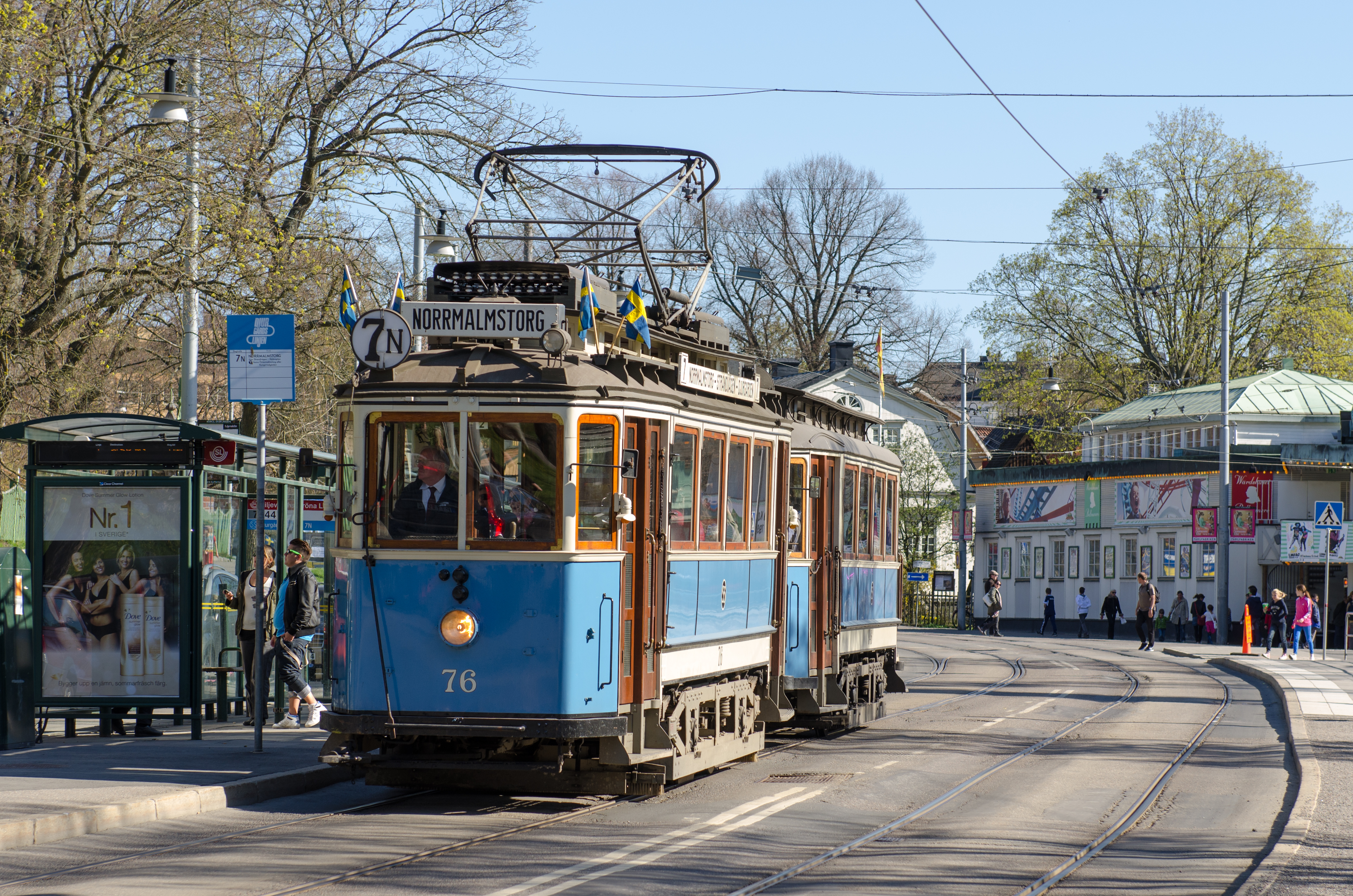
Djurgårdslinjen tram No. 76

In Oslo, the Tramway Museum operates veteran trams on the tram network of Oslo on the first Sunday of every month.

=== Portugal ===
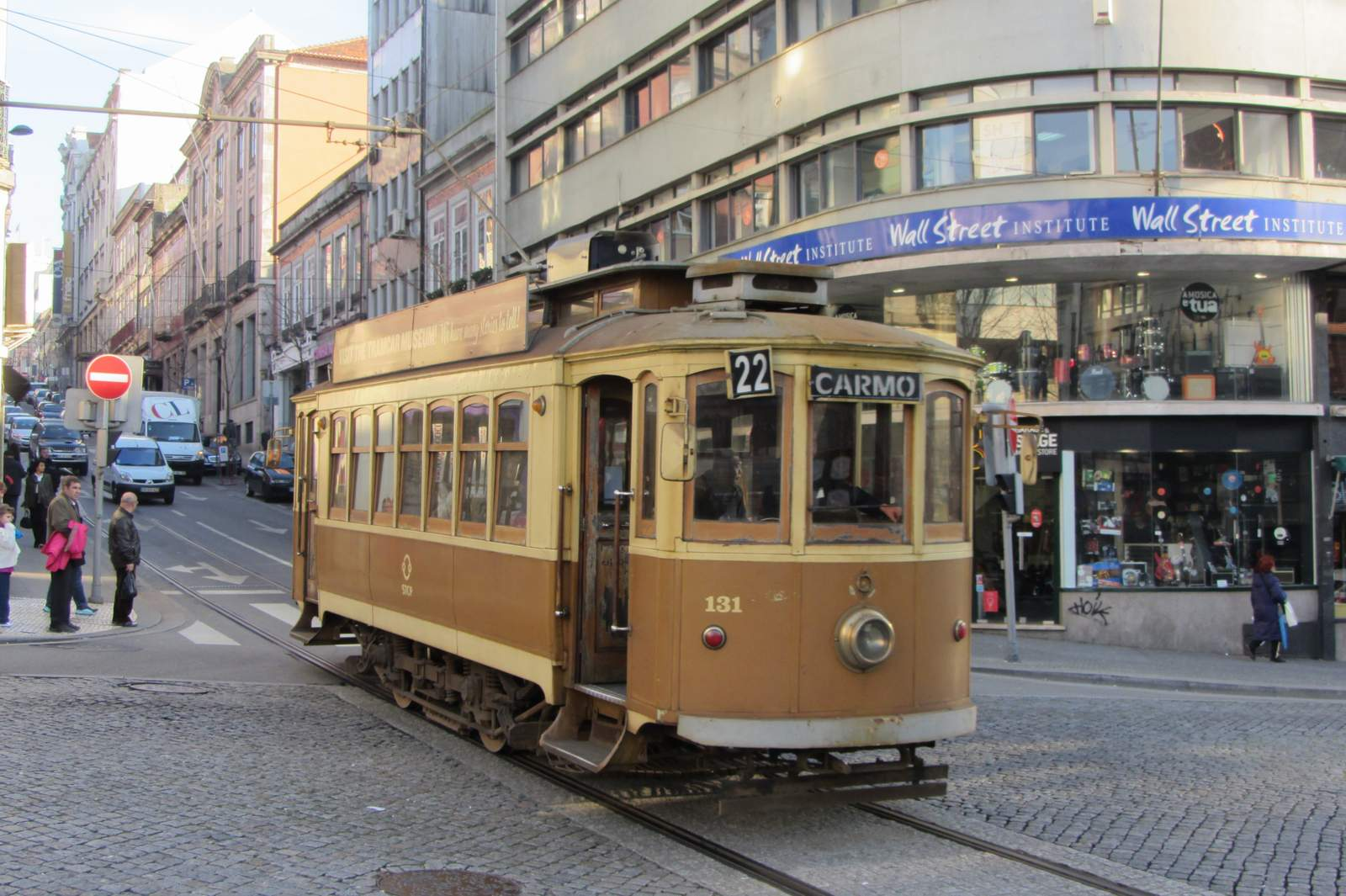
Tourist line in Porto, No. 131

Heritage trams provide all of the service on some of routes of the Lisbon tramway network, and in Porto a long-closed section of tramway in the historic Batalha section of the town center was reopened in 2007 for use by historic trams. There are now three such heritage routes in Porto, as well as a tram museum. In Sintra, there is a seasonally operated heritage tramway.

=== Romania ===
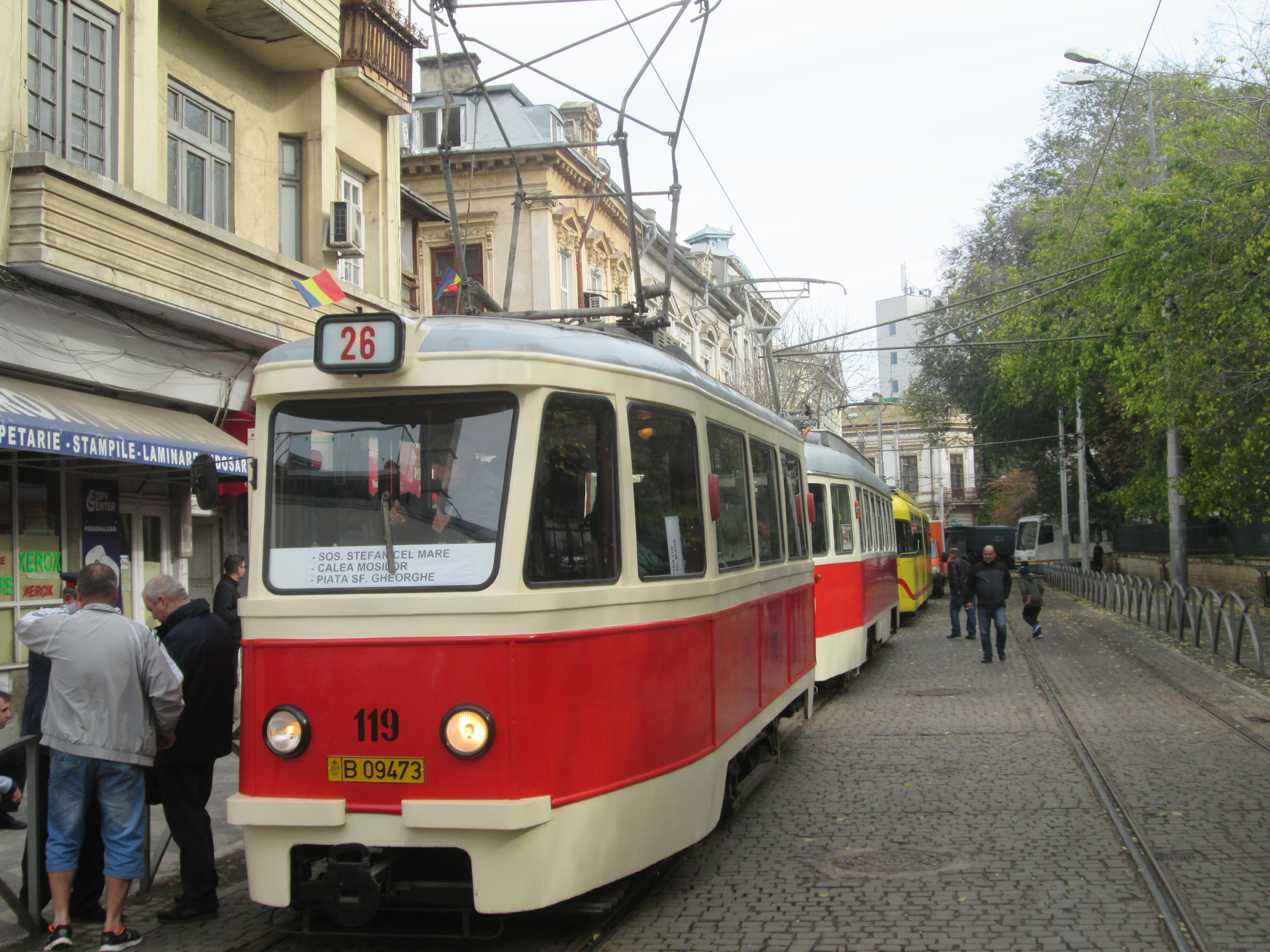
V56 tram No. 119 in Timișoara

STB in Bucharest maintains an extensive fleet of heritage trams on its tram system.

=== Russia ===
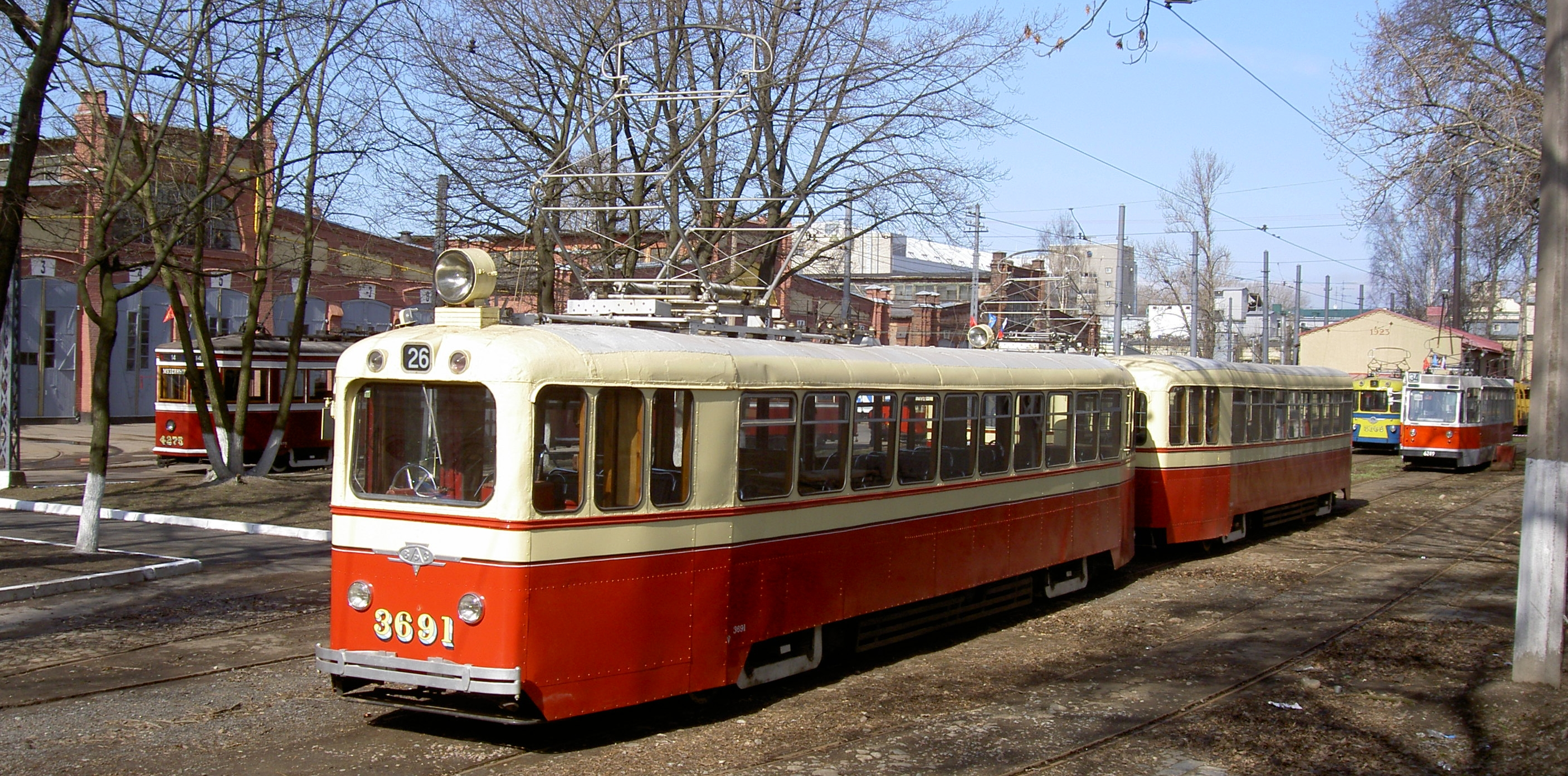
Saint Petersburg LM-49 tram No. 3691

In Saint Petersburg, on Vasilyevsky Island the former Vasileostrovsky tram depot, which closed in the 1990s after the city's extensive tram network was curtailed amid increasing automobile traffic, was converted into the Museum of Electrical Transport. Apart from operating excursions, the museum organizes museum-fleet rides along downtown tracks (including some sections no longer in use for regular tram service) during a number of public festivals and on some summer weekends. A heritage tram of the type that used to run from the inner city nearly to the nearby front line during the World War II siege of the city is installed as a war and tram memorial, not far from Avtovo metro station. A modern replica of a late-19th-century horsecar stands in front of Vasileostrovskaya metro station.

=== Spain ===
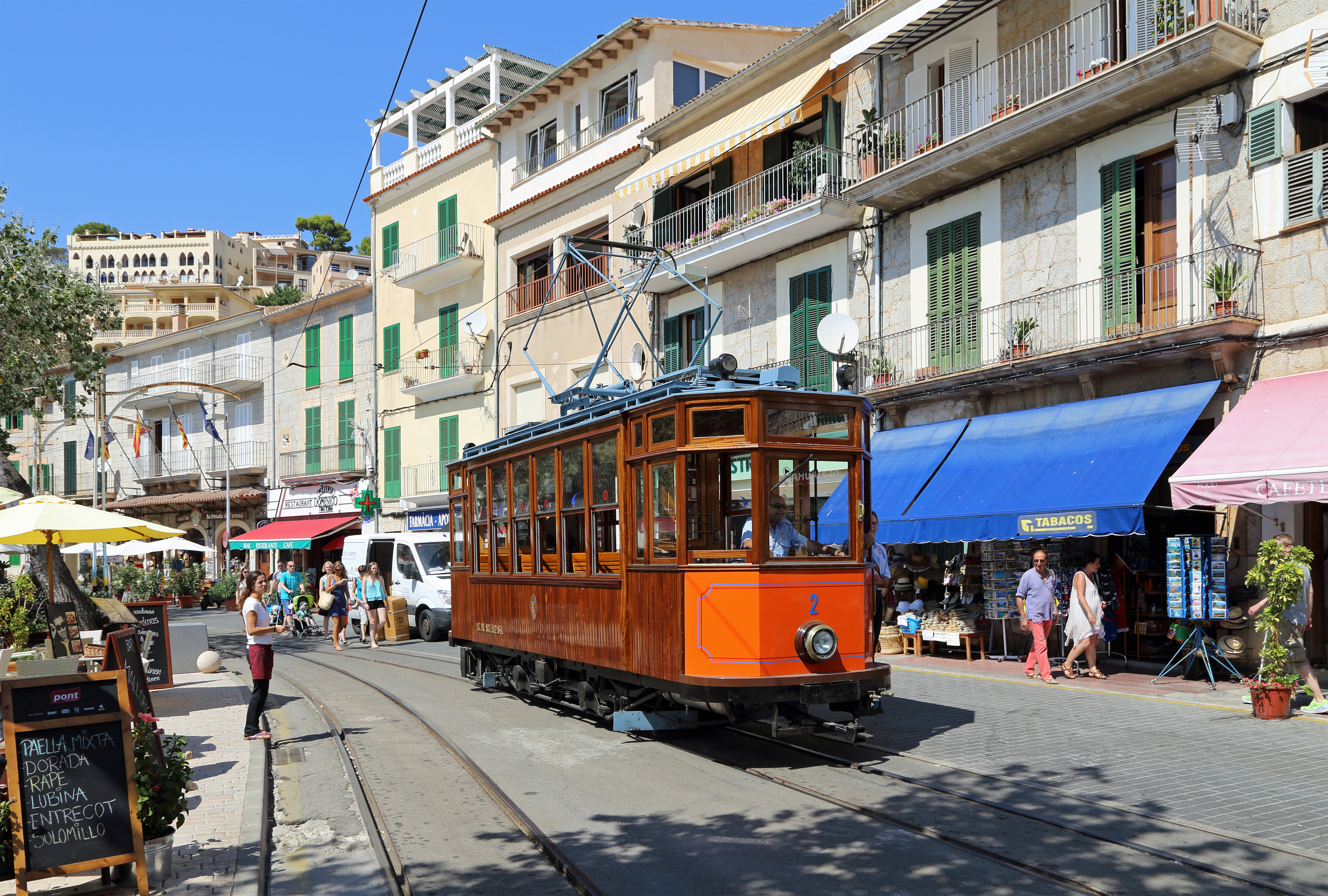
Soller tram No. 2, Mallorca, Spain

In Spain, a new heritage tramway was opened in A Coruña (La Coruña) in 1997. However, it has not operated since 2011. Tramvia Blau in Barcelona, also known as the Tibidabo tramway, has been in operation since 1904 but still uses trams built in 1904–15, and thus has become a heritage line; however, the line has been closed temporarily for reconstruction since 2018. Similarly, the tramway connecting Sóller with Puerto de Sóller, on the island of Mallorca, has been in operation since 1913 but still uses tramcars from the 1910s and 1920s. Therefore, it is a heritage line.

=== Sweden ===
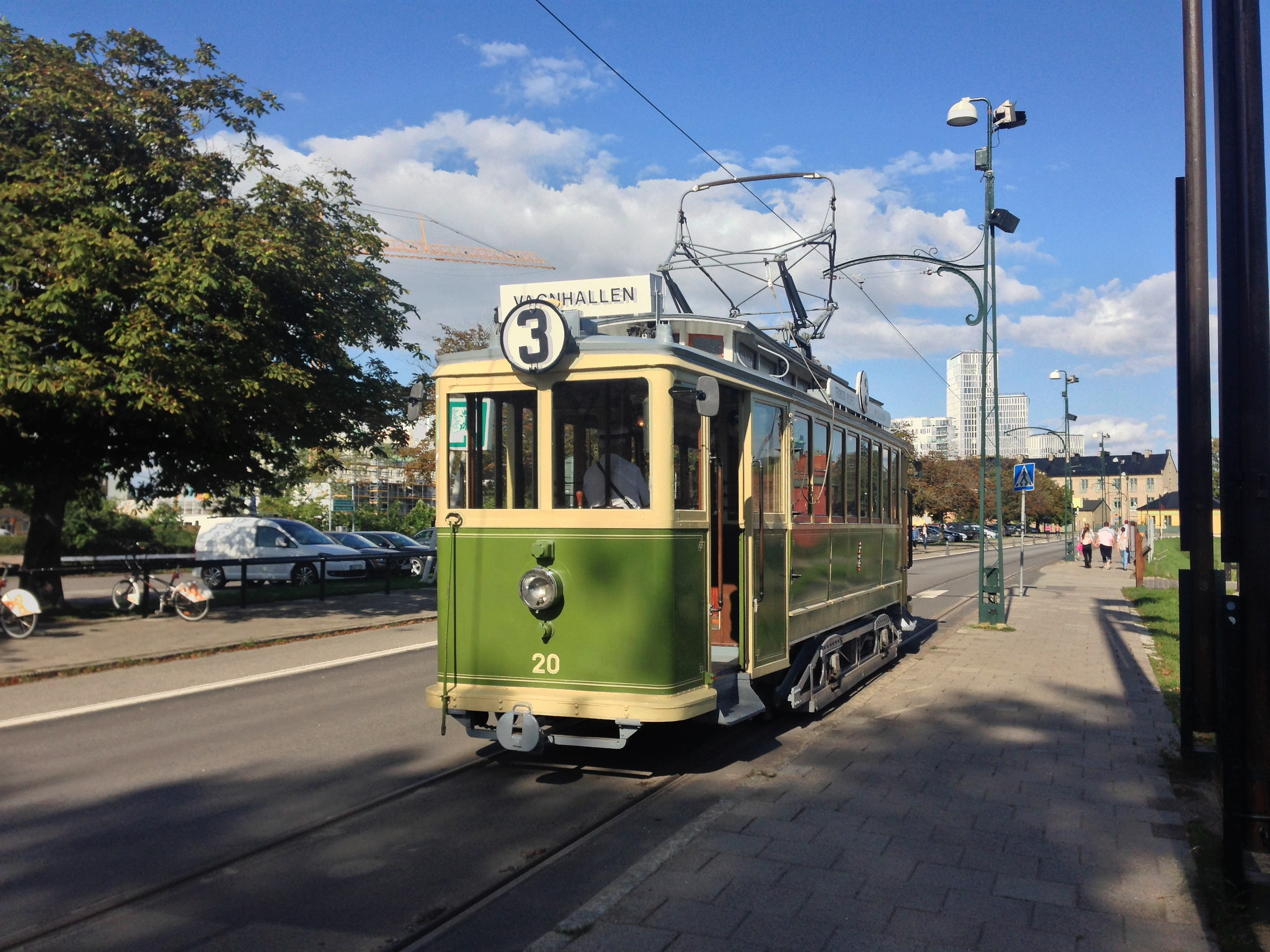
Trams in Malmö G tram No. 20

In Malmö, a technical museum operates an in-street heritage tram line in the summer months. In Stockholm, a 3-kilometre (1.9 mi) section of former route 7 was reopened in 1991 as a heritage tramway, using vintage cars.

There is another tram museum in Malmköping. Museispårvägen Malmköping runs along a short stretch of the former Mellersta Södermanlands Järnväg (MlSlJ) between Malmköping and Hosjö.

In Gothenburg, a heritage line is operated by the local tram association, Ringlinjen. The line is known as Lisebergs linjen. It runs alongside the regular trams between the central station and Liseberg amusement park. All trams on the line are vintage trams from the city. Ringlinjen also operates a tram museum in an old depot.

=== Switzerland ===
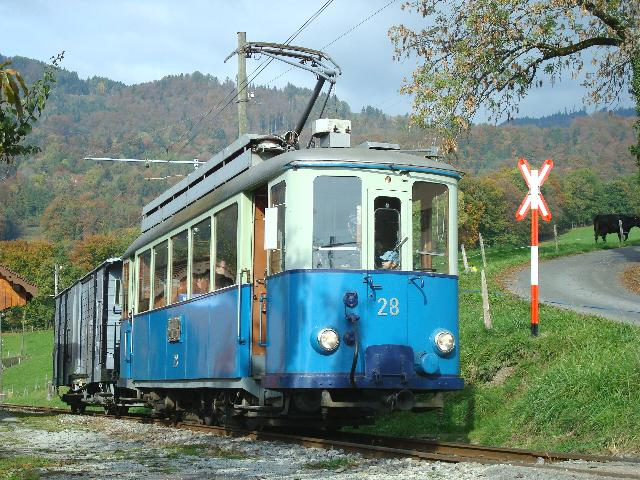
Lausanne car No. 28 on the Blonay-Chamby Museum line

Historic trams operate at the Blonay–Chamby Museum Railway.

=== Turkey ===
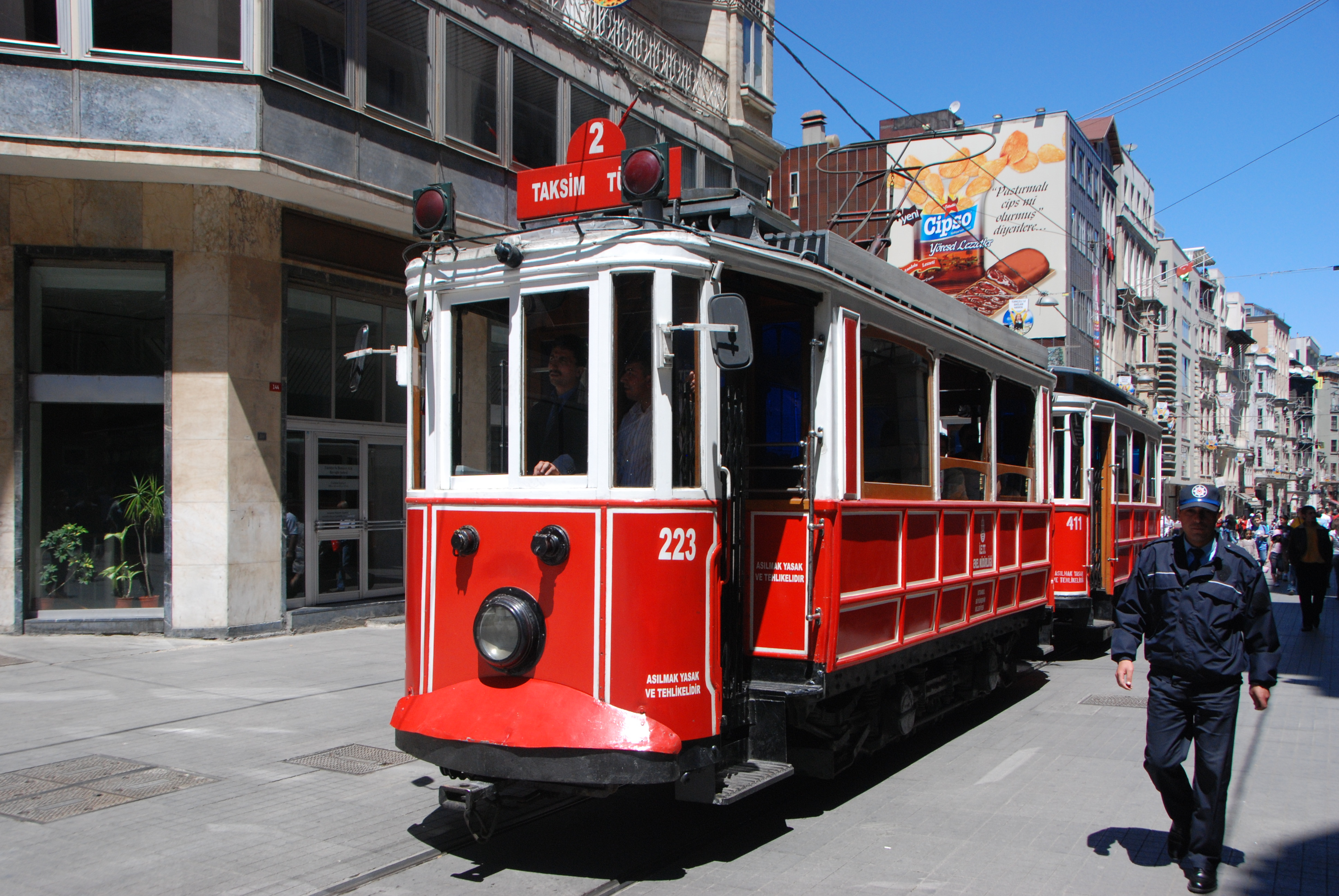
Istanbul nostalgic car 223

Two separate heritage tramways operate in Istanbul; T2 on the European side of the Bosporus and T3 on the Asian side. The former opened in 1990 between Tünel (funicular station) and Taksim metro station, and the latter in 2003 in the suburb of Kadıköy.

A heritage tram line opened in 1999 in Antalya, serving the Antalya Museum, the historic city centre, Hadrian's Gate, and ending at the eastern end of Işıklar Street. Another one opened in 2011 in the city of Bursa.

=== United Kingdom and Crown dependencies ===
In the United Kingdom the majority of tram lines were closed before the heritage movement began to flourish, the tracks and trams scrapped. Although trams have returned to several British cities since the 1990s, they are modern transportation systems (also known as light rail), not heritage operations. There are, however, three notable heritage tram operations in the UK and Crown dependencies.

- The National Tramway Museum at Crich, near Matlock, is located in an old limestone quarry in Derbyshire, and has a collection of preserved trams. Strictly speaking, this would be considered a tramway museum with an operating tram line, rather than being a heritage tramway.
- Among the heritage railways on the Isle of Man, at least the Manx Electric Railway & Snaefell Mountain Railway both qualify as a heritage tramways as well.
- Otherwise, the Blackpool tramway is the only surviving first-generation urban tram system in the UK and provides a service running along the town's promenade and also as far as Fleetwood using both historic and modern trams.

(There is also a modern heritage tramway in Birkenhead, Merseyside.)

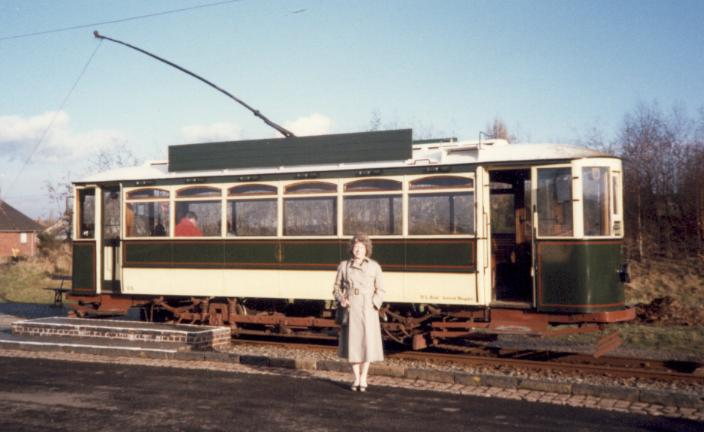
Dudley tram No. 5 of 1920 operating at Black Country Museum

Places in the United Kingdom and Crown dependencies where preserved trams operate
Tramway	Location
England
Beamish Museum	Near Stanley, County Durham
Black Country Living Museum	Dudley near Wolverhampton, West Midlands
Blackpool Tramway	Blackpool, Lancashire
East Anglia Transport Museum	Near Lowestoft, Suffolk
Heaton Park Tramway	Greater Manchester
National Tramway Museum	Crich near Matlock, Derbyshire
Seaton Tramway	Devon
Shipley Glen Tramway	Near Saltaire, West Yorkshire
Volk's Electric Railway	Brighton, East Sussex
Isle of Man
Manx Electric Railway	
Snaefell Mountain Railway	
Scotland
Summerlee Heritage Park	Near Coatbridge, North Lanarkshire
Wales
Great Orme Tramway	Llandudno, North Wales

== North America ==
=== Canada ===
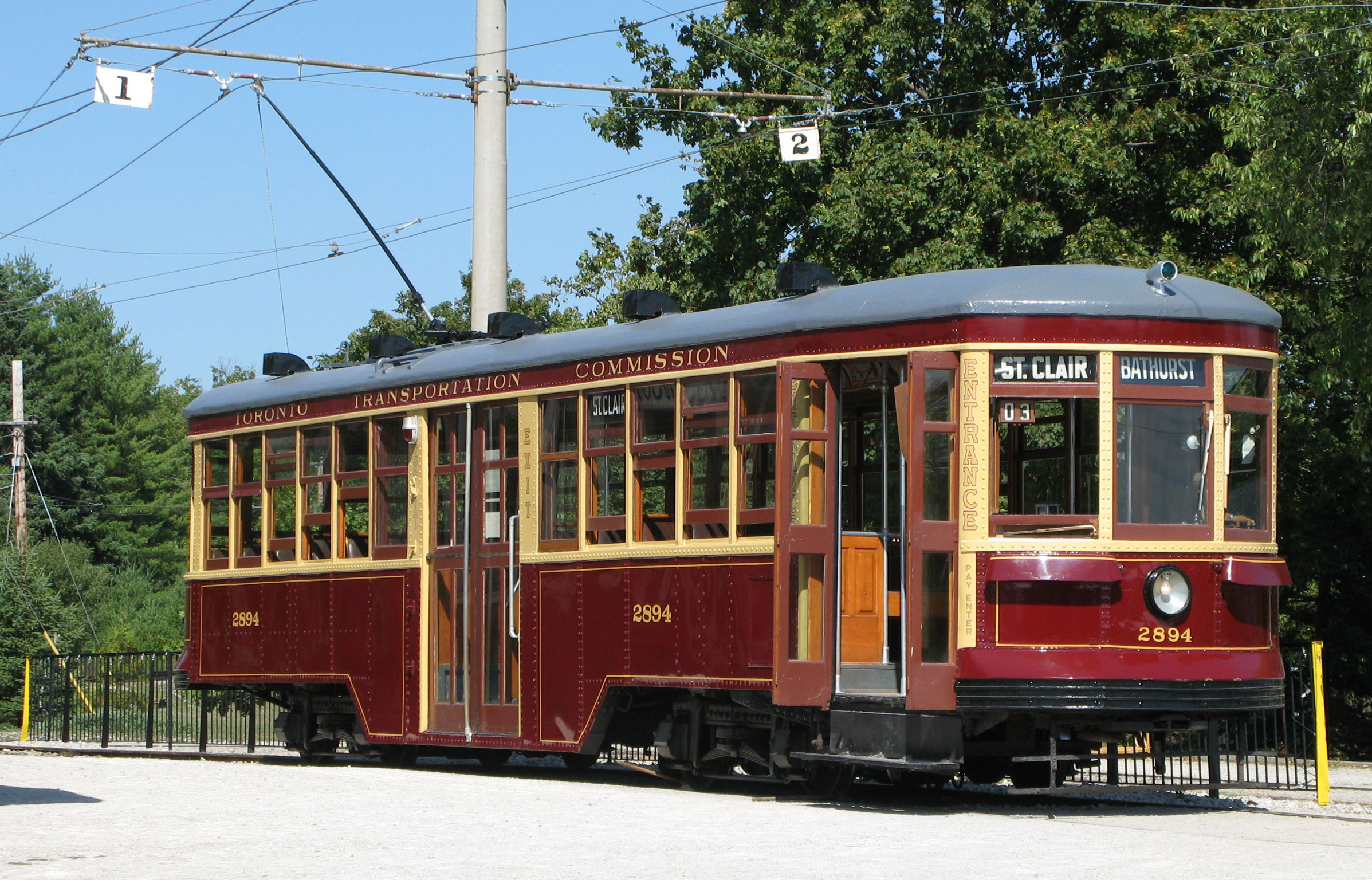
Ex-Toronto Peter Witt streetcar No. 2894 at the Halton County Radial Railway

- The Edmonton Radial Railway Society restores and operates historic streetcars on two lines in Edmonton, Alberta. Seven streetcars transport guests around Fort Edmonton Park, and three streetcars – including one from Japan and another from Australia – operate on a second line that takes passengers between Whyte Avenue and Jasper Avenue, via the High Level Bridge. An additional 17 streetcars are either being restored by volunteers, or awaiting restoration. The organization is named after the Edmonton Radial Railway, which operated streetcars in the city for 43 years.
- The Toronto Transit Commission retains a fleet of heritage streetcars. All are currently out of service following the conversion of the system from trolley pole to pantograph current collection. Previously, two PCC and one Peter Witt cars were used on regular streetcar tracks, on a private-rental basis as well as for special events. The TTC often operated a PCC streetcar on route 509 Harbourfront on Sundays during the summer.

=== United States ===
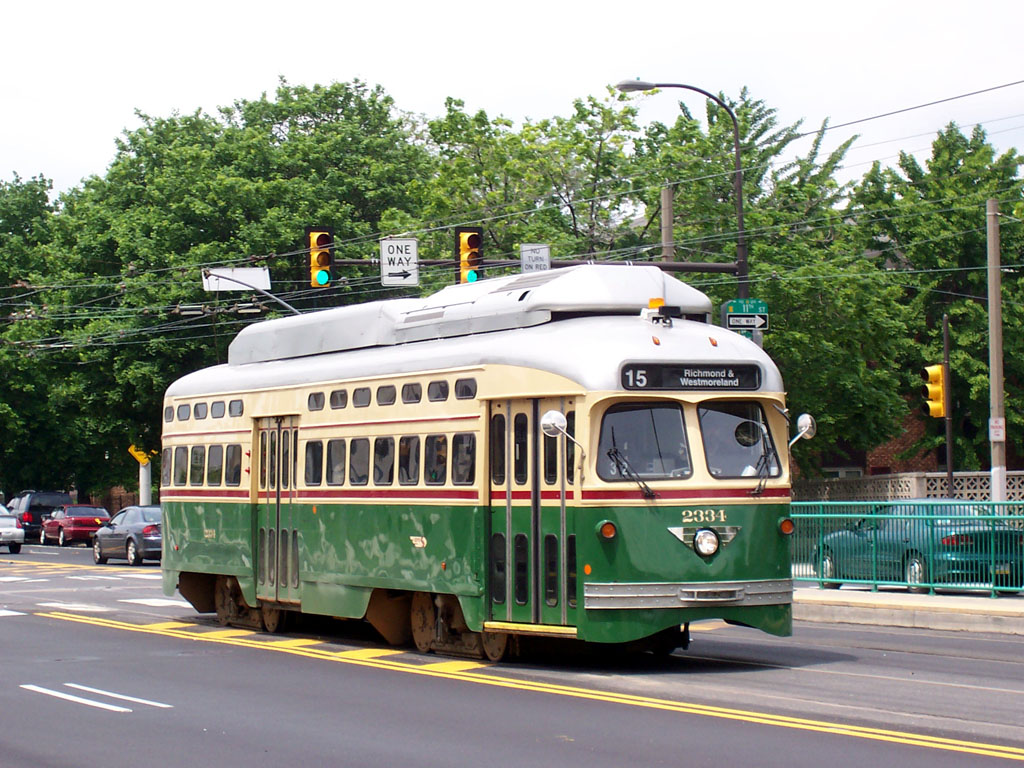
PCC streetcar No. 2334 on SEPTA route 15 in Philadelphia around 2006

The San Francisco Municipal Railway, or Muni, runs exclusively historic trolleys on its heavily used F Market & Wharves line. The line serves Market Street and the tourist areas along the Embarcadero, including Fisherman's Wharf.

Boston's Massachusetts Bay Transportation Authority runs exclusively PCC streetcars on its Mattapan Line, part of that authority's Red Line. The historic rolling stock is retained because doing so cost less than would a full rebuild of the line to accommodate either a heavy rail line (like the rest of the Red Line or the Blue or Orange Lines) or a modern light rail line (like the Green Line). It is also unique in that it used almost exclusively by commuters and is not particularly popular with tourists (and thus may not really be a true heritage system, despite the historic rolling stock).

Dallas has the M-Line Trolley along McKinnney Avenue and other streets near downtown. Denver has the Platte Valley Trolley, a heritage line recalling the open-sided streetcars of the early 20th century. The VTA in San Jose, California, also maintains a heritage trolley fleet for occasional use on the downtown portion of a new light rail system opened in 1988. The MATA Trolley system in Memphis, Tennessee, opened in 1993 and is served exclusively by vintage and replica-vintage streetcars. Similar operations include the Metro Streetcar (opened in 2004) in Little Rock, Arkansas, and the TECO Line Streetcar (opened 2002) in Tampa, Florida – although these two are served entirely or almost entirely by replicas of vintage streetcars. Other cities with heritage streetcar lines include Galveston, Texas; Kenosha, Wisconsin; and El Paso, Texas. The National Park Service operates a system in Lowell, Massachusetts.

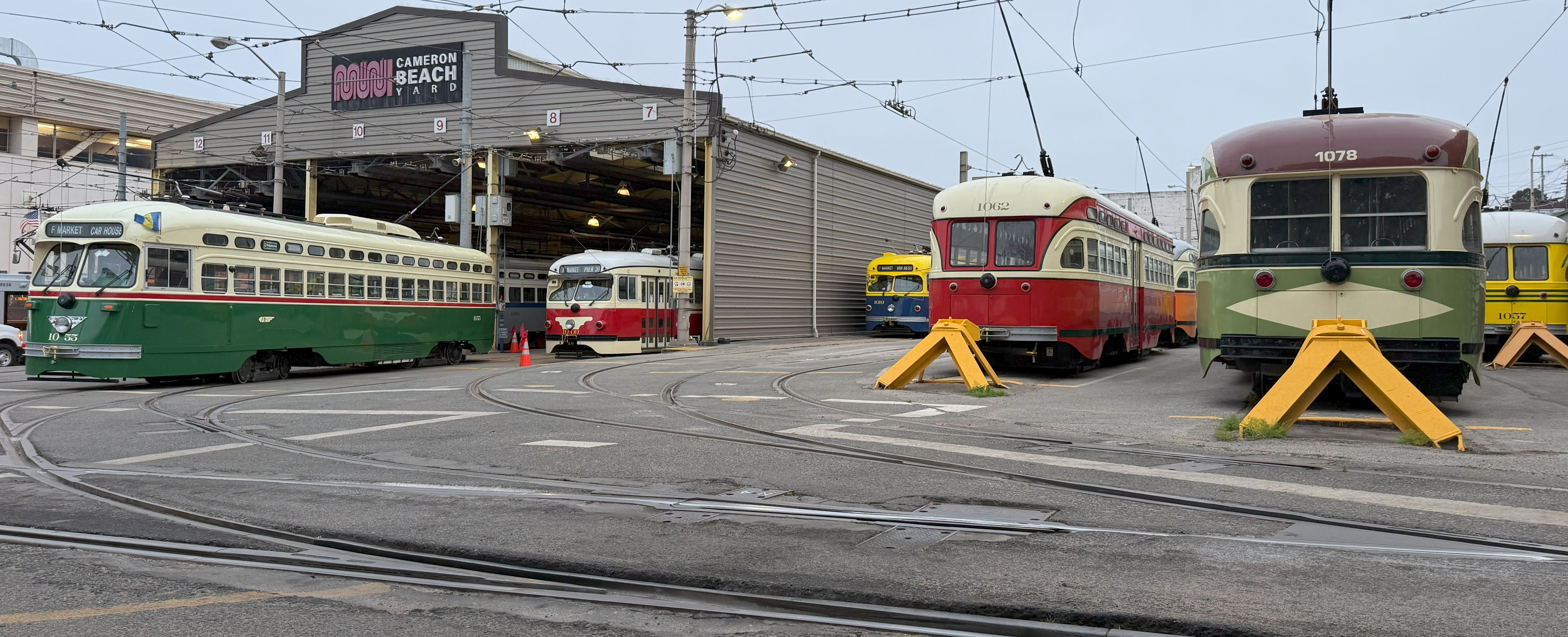
San Francisco Municipal Railway historic streetcars at Cameron Beach Yard in 2025

In San Francisco, parts of the cable car and Muni streetcar system (specifically the above-mentioned F Market & Wharves line) are heritage lines, although they are also functioning parts of the city's transit system. The cable cars are a U.S. National Historic Landmark and are rare examples of vehicles with this distinction. Located east of San Francisco is one of several museums in the U.S. that restore and operate vintage streetcars and interurbans, the Western Railway Museum.

The Fort Collins Municipal Railway operates Birney Safety Cars on a restored track that runs from City Park to Old Town in Fort Collins, Colorado. In Arkansas, in addition to the service in Little Rock, the Fort Smith Trolley Museum operates restored trams from the former streetcar systems of Fort Smith and Hot Springs, Arkansas, on an approximately three-quarters-mile-long (1.2 km) line, year-round. One of the Birney cars in Fort Collins (No. 21) and the similar Birney car operating in Fort Smith (No. 224) are listed on the U.S. National Register of Historic Places.

== South America ==
=== Argentina ===
In Buenos Aires, a heritage tram line was inaugurated in 1980 in the Caballito neighbourhood on existing vintage street tracks.

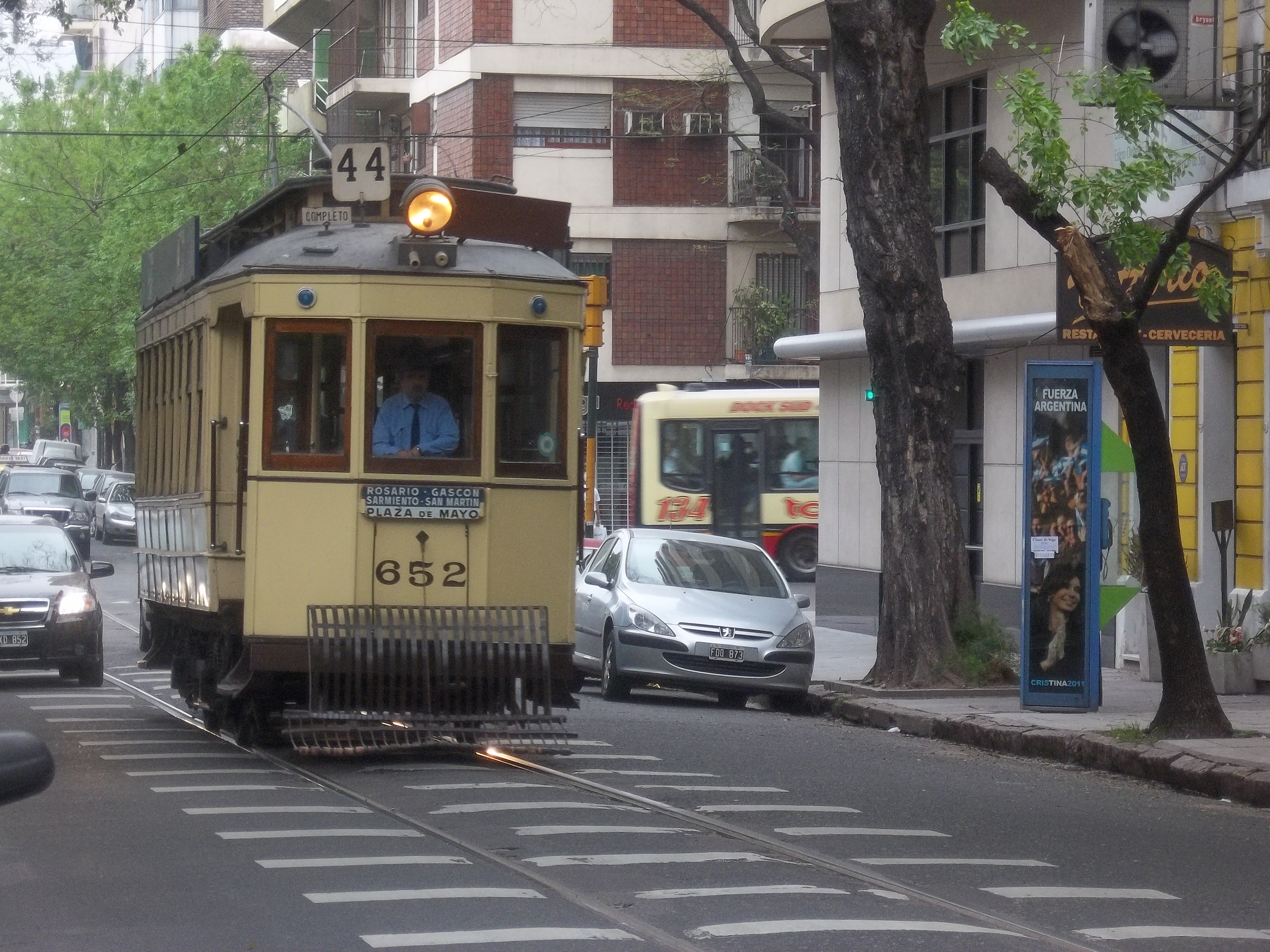
Tramcar No. 652 of the Asociación Amigos del Tranvía, Caballito, Buenos Aires

Buenos Aires also hosts the La Brugeoise cars, the Buenos Aires Metro (Subte) Line A rolling stock, since its inauguration in 1913. They were built by Belgian railway rolling stock manufacturer La Brugeoise, et Nicaise, et Delcuve between 1911 and 1919 for the Anglo-Argentine Tramways Company's (Compañía de Tranvías Anglo-Argentina, CTAA in Spanish) first metro line. They were originally designed to run both as metro and tramway cars, but they were refurbished in 1927 for underground use only. They are the oldest metro rolling stock in commercial service in the world as well as a tourist attraction and part of Buenos Aires cultural heritage. The A line also contains a vintage station, Perú. They have been in continuous use for a whole century from 1913 to January 2013 when they were replaced by new coaches, with an average of about 300,000 daily passengers, up from the 170,000 who traveled on them on their first day. Some of the coaches had already been preserved for touristic purposes, and now the rest of the fleet is under careful restoration and is intended to render service on weekends and holidays.

=== Brazil ===
Santos: After briefly operating a short heritage line along Embaré Beach in the mid-1980s, the city of Santos in 2000 opened a new heritage tramway in the historic Valongo district, using a car built in 1911 and retaining the former city system's peculiar rail gauge of 1,350 mm (4 ft 5 5/32 in). The line is being extended, and additional trams have been added.

Belém: A heritage tramway was opened in the city of Belém in 2005.

Campinas: A heritage tramway has been in operation at Campinas's Parque Portugal since 1972.

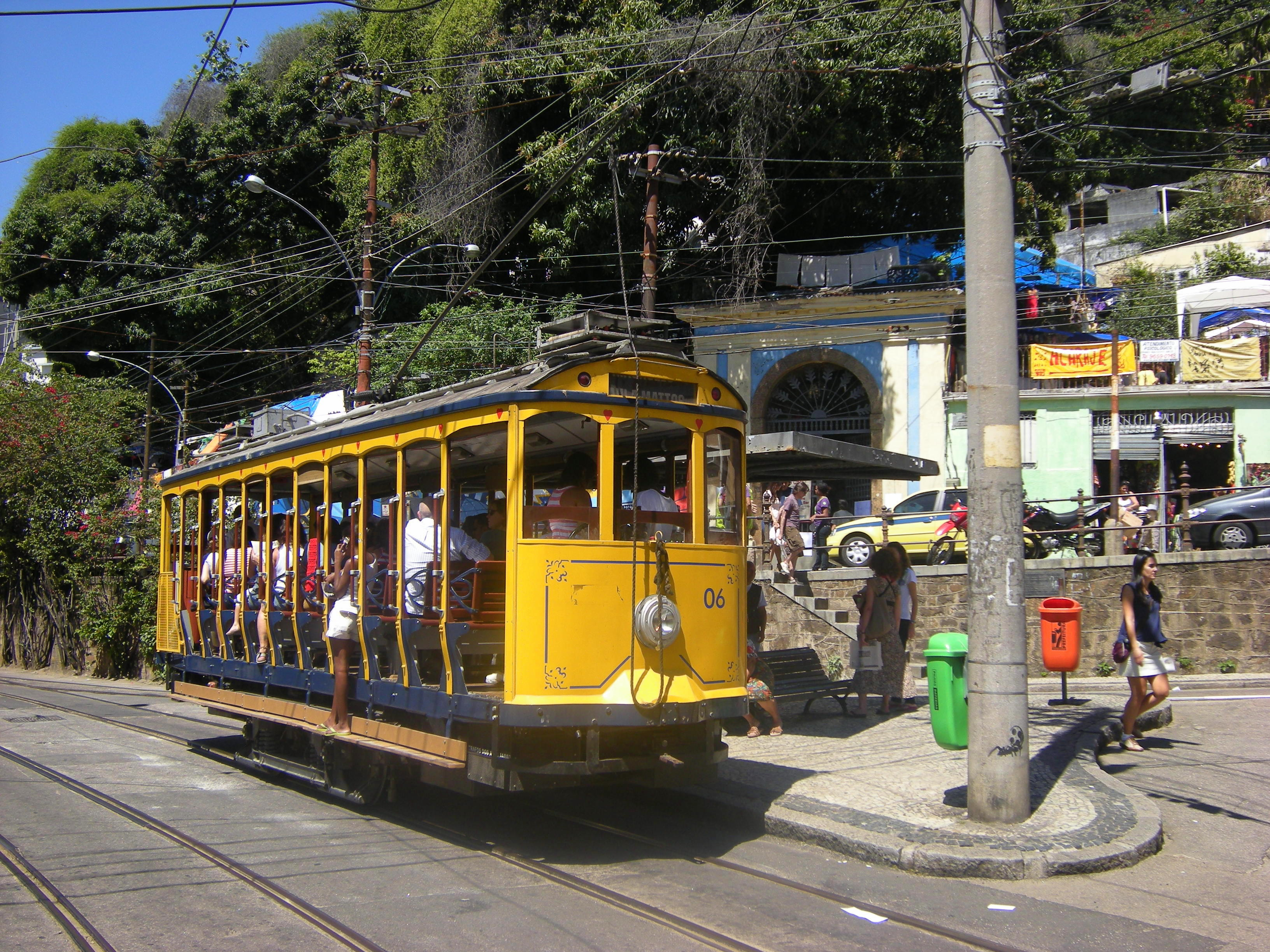
Santa Teresa tram No. 06

Rio de Janeiro: The Santa Teresa Tramway, which has operated in the Santa Teresa district of Rio de Janeiro since the 19th century, is not primarily a tourist line but can be considered a heritage tramway because of its continued use of vintage or, since 2015, faux-vintage tramcars.

=== Chile ===
A heritage tramway was opened in Iquique in 2004.

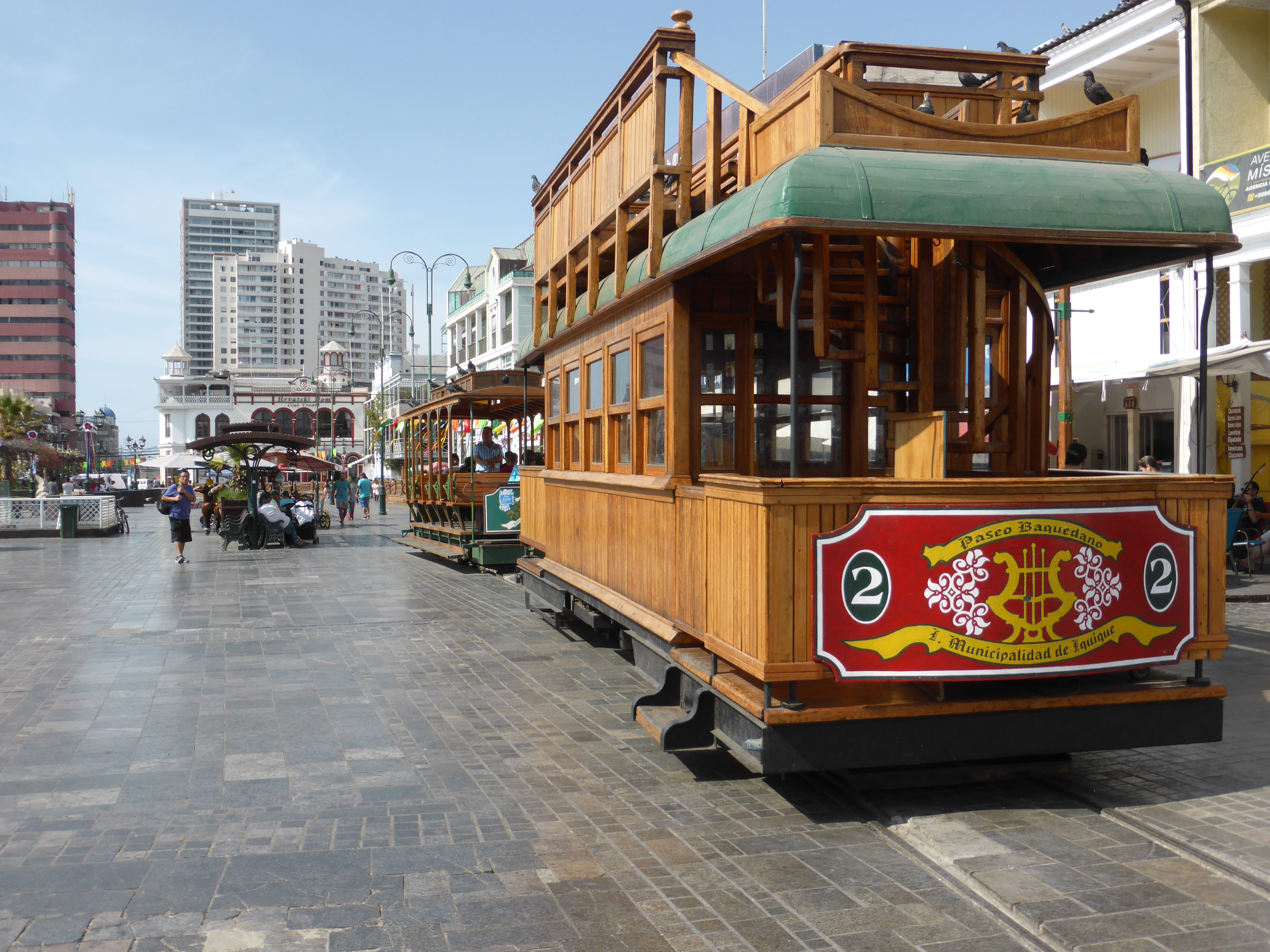
Two new tourist trams leave from Plaza Arturo Prat. Iquique, Tarapacá Region, Chile

=== Peru ===
A short heritage tramway was opened in Lima in 1997.

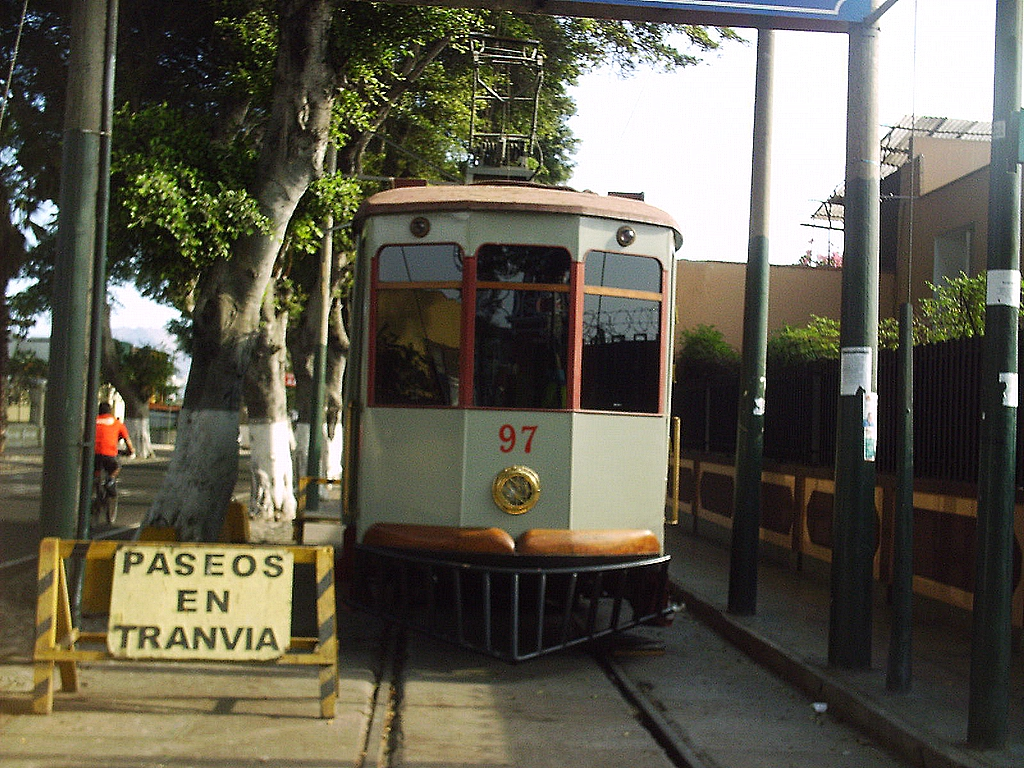
Lima Tramway car 97 Lima, Peru

=== Uruguay ===
The first heritage tramway in Latin America opened in Montevideo in 1967, using a restored vintage tram on a reopened section of former tram line. It closed in 1974.

== Asia ==
=== Mainland China ===
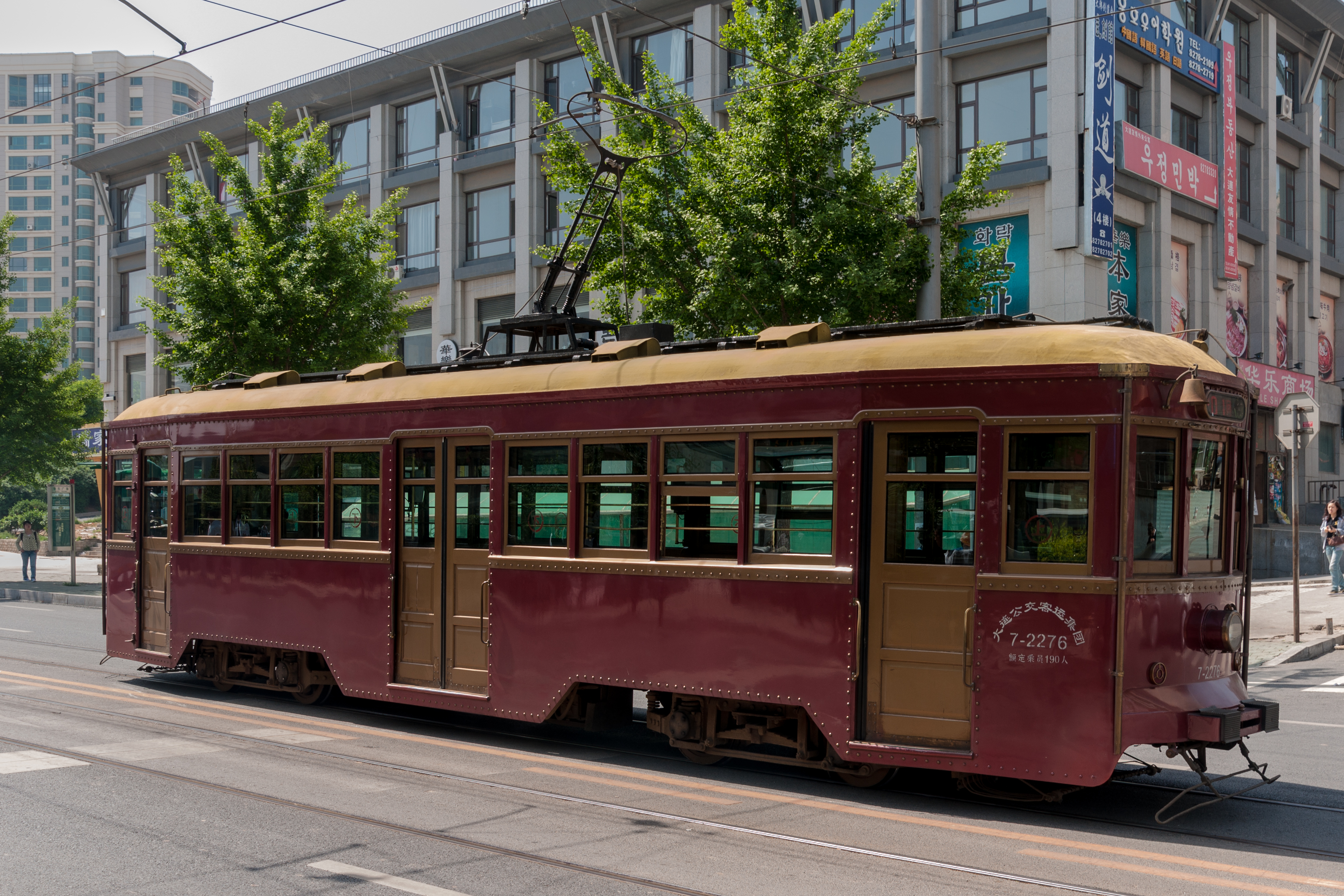
Dalian historical tram No. 7-2276

Heritage trams operate in Changchun, Jilin and Dalian, Liaoning.

=== Hong Kong ===
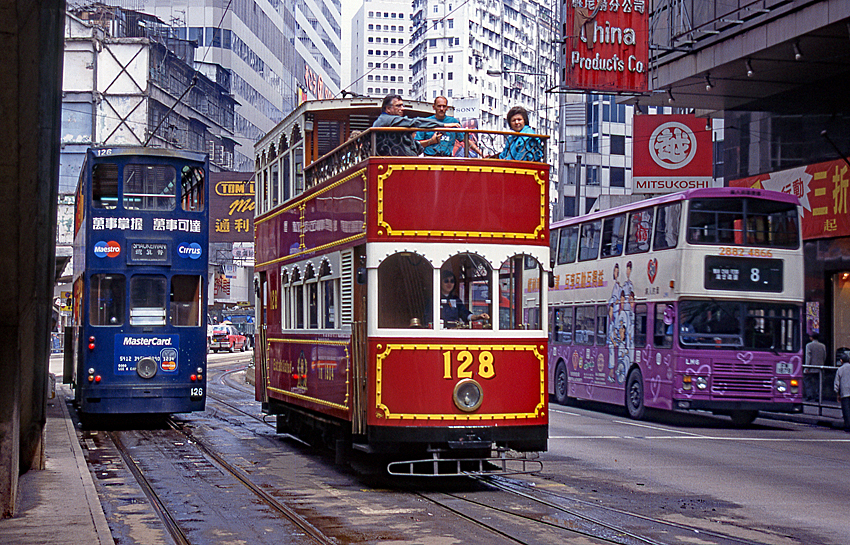
Hong Kong tramcar No. 128

The Hong Kong Tramways –opened in 1904– and the Peak Tram on Hong Kong Island –opened in 1888– are considered part of the heritage of Hong Kong.

=== Japan ===
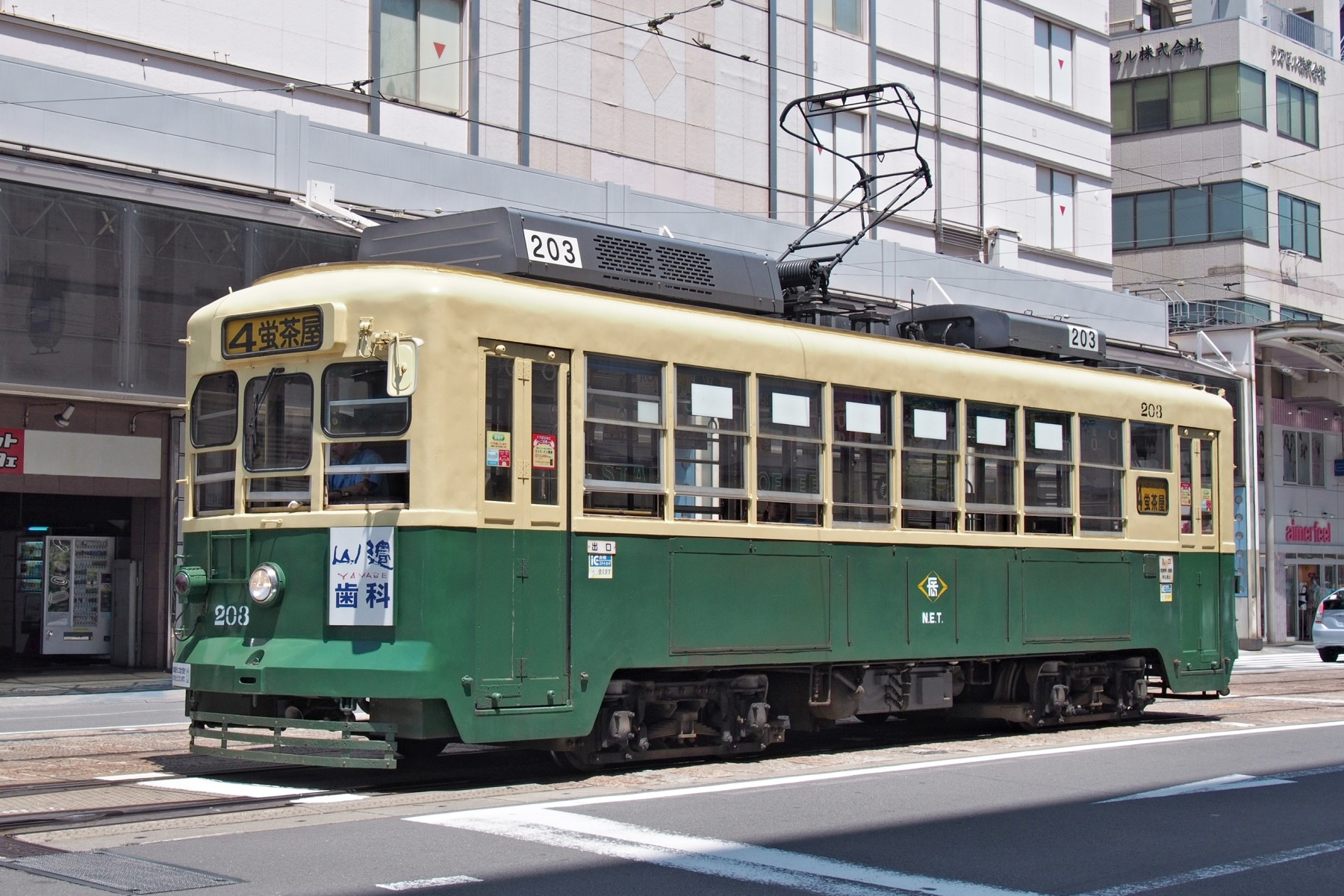
Nagasaki Electric Tramway Type 201 No. 203

The Nagasaki Electric Tramway and Hiroshima Electric Railway both regularly operate vintage trams alongside modern rolling stock. Additionally, the Hakodate City Tram operates vintage trams for use on tourist runs during the summer.

== Africa ==
=== South Africa ===
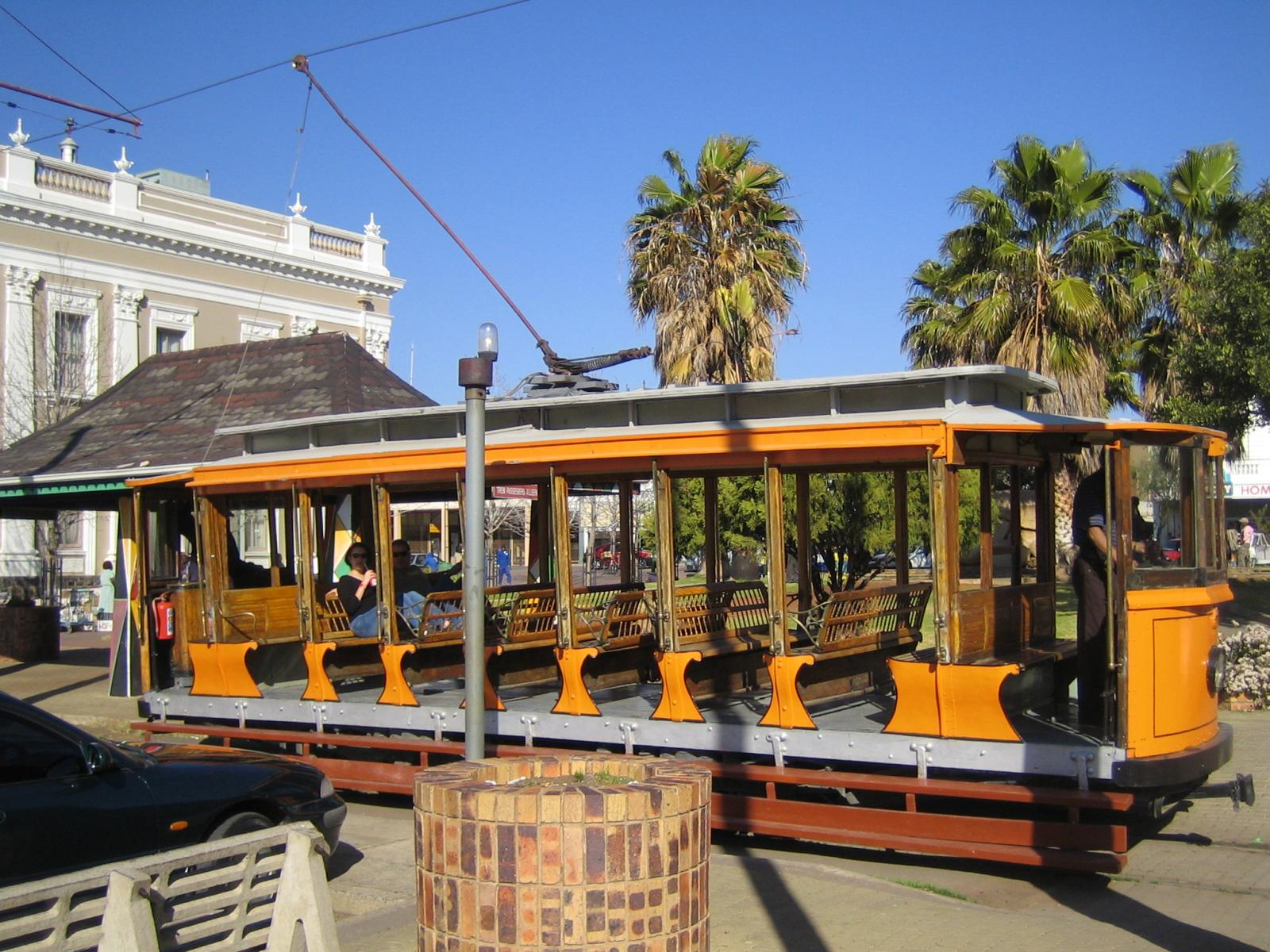
Historical tramway at Market Square Kimberley, Northern Cape, South Africa

There have been heritage trams in Kimberley, Northern Cape, since 1985.

== Oceania ==
=== Australia ===
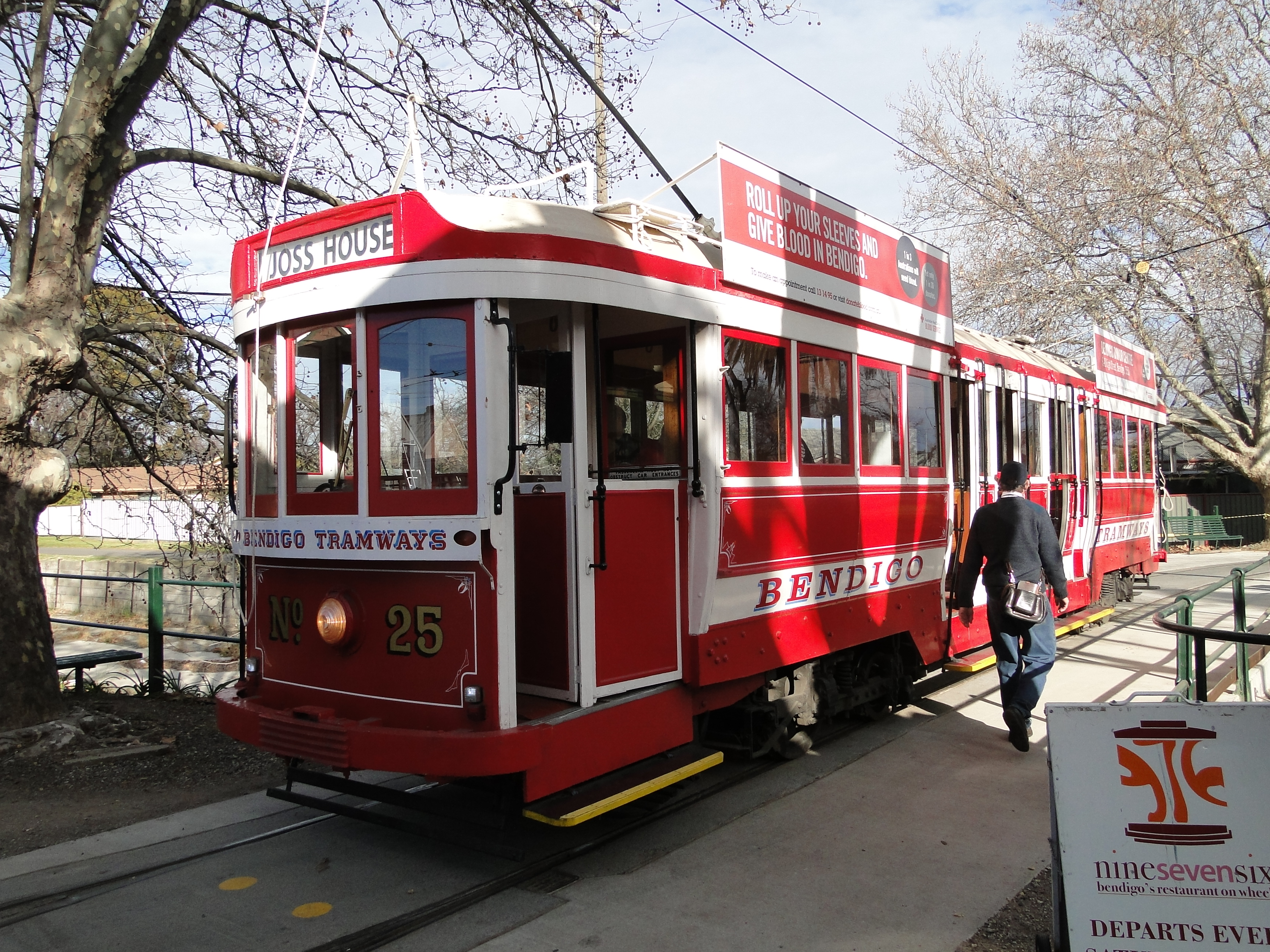
Bendigo tram No. 25, Victoria, Australia

The most significant heritage line operates in Melbourne, the City Circle tram, using historic Melbourne tramcars, which shares its route with other regular tram lines. Heritage lines also exist in Ballarat, Bendigo, Portland, Sydney and Brisbane.

Museums with operating heritage trams can also be found in Perth, Adelaide, and Launceston.

=== New Zealand ===
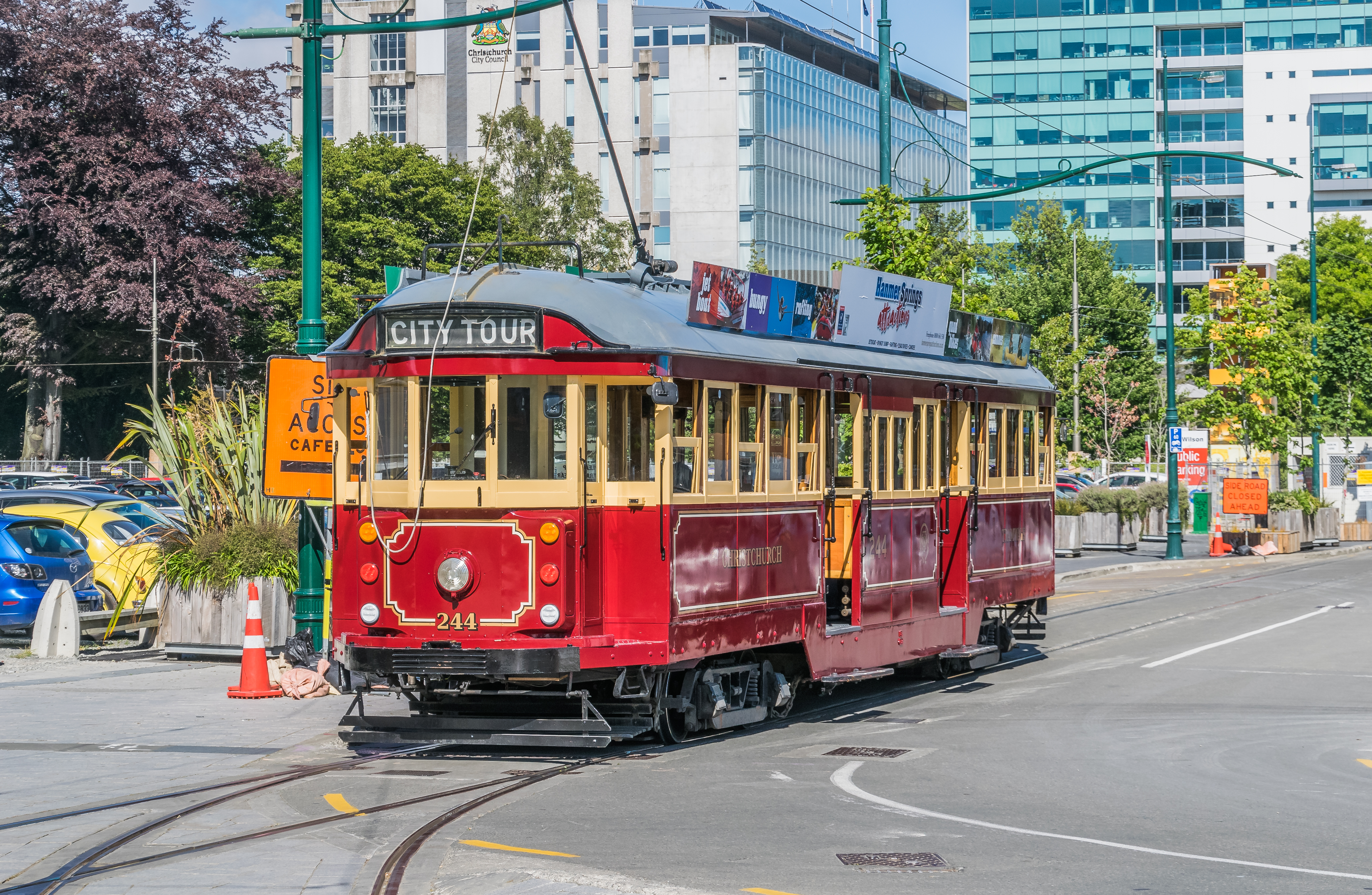
Melbourne tram No. 244 in Christchurch, New Zealand

A new city-center heritage tramway was opened in Christchurch in 1995. Auckland also has a short heritage line loop in the Wynyard Quarter District called the Dockline Tram, which opened in 2011, closed several times due major roadworks, and reopened in 2021. It is operated on behalf of the Auckland Council's Development arm by the Museum of Transport & Technology.

== See also ==
- Heritage railway
- History of trams
- List of town tramway systems
