= Parque Portugal =

Park in Brazil

Coordinates: 22°52′29.06″S 47°03′00.50″W

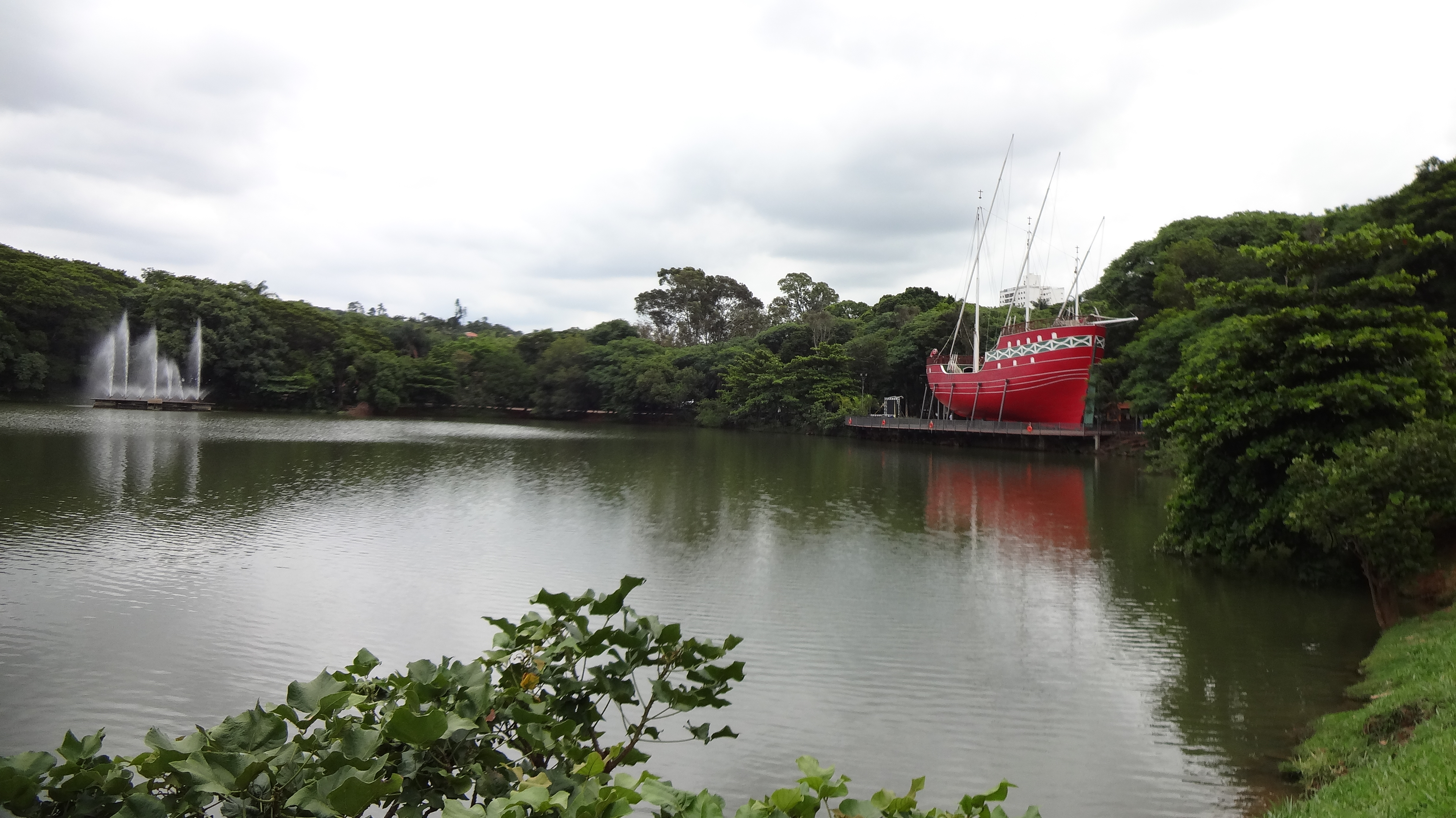
Isaura Teles Alves de Lima lagoon

Parque Portugal, also known as Lagoa do Taquaral (Portuguese pronunciation: [laˈɡoɐ du taˈkwaɾaw]), is an urban public park in the city of Campinas, São Paulo, Brazil. It is set around a beautiful lagoon and adjacent wooded park, and is a large municipal entertainment and sports park, with a planetarium, a science museum, an indoor sports stadium and swimming pool, kart racing and model airplane areas, an open concert auditorium, a floating caravel replica, a working historical tramway, pedalos, facilities for several types of sports, including a long track for running, cycling and walking, restaurants, etc.

Taquaral means "bamboo grove" in Portuguese, probably because the lagoon was originally rimmed with this kind of plant (it no longer is, instead eucalyptus trees have been planted around it). The name Portugal was given as a homage to the immigrants of Brazil, the Portuguese people.

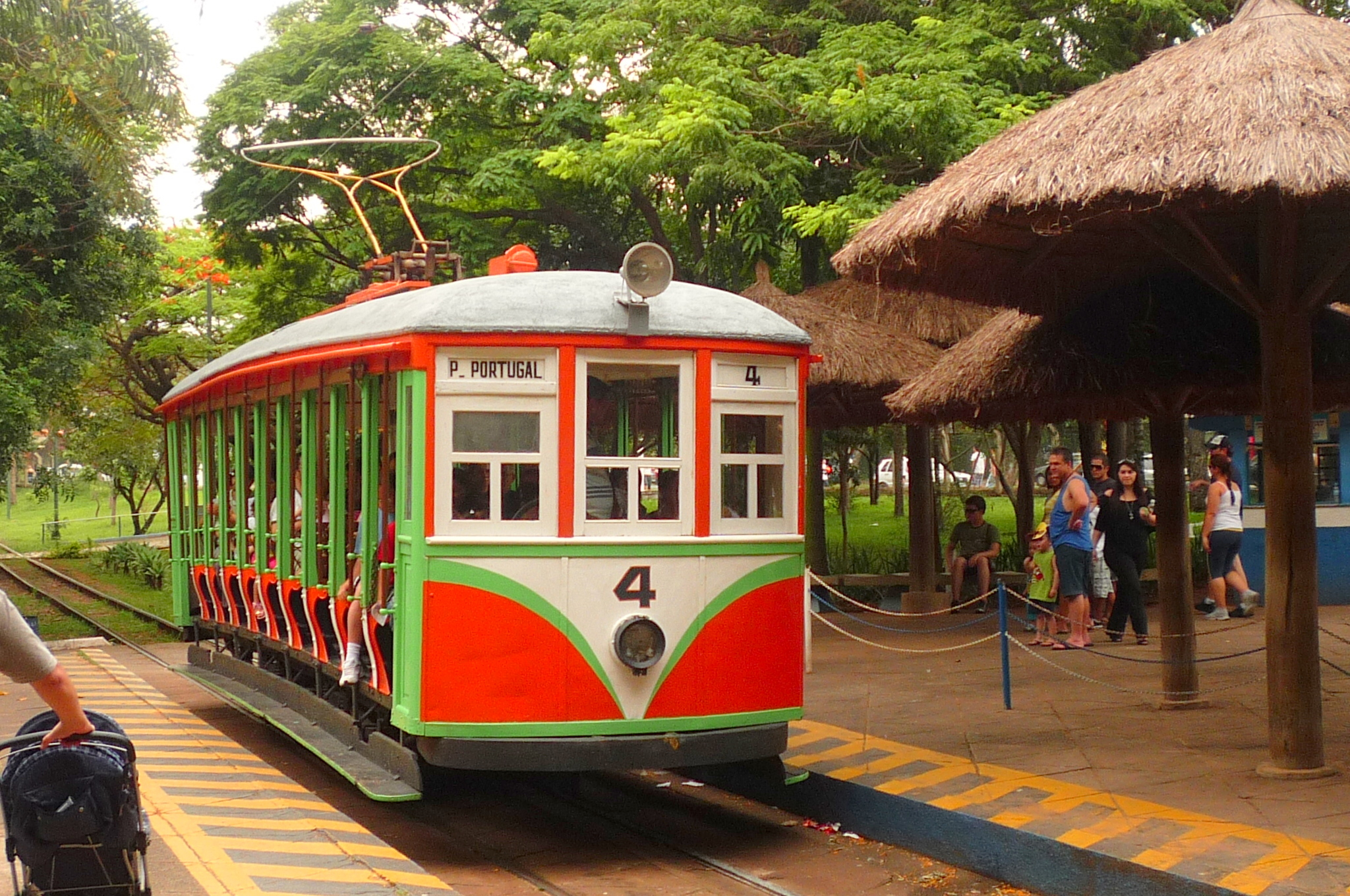
One of the vintage tramcars in operation on the 1972-opened tram line

The heritage tram line around the park opened in 1972 and uses four historic trams. The tramway was newly built at that time and opened only four years after the termination of the city's last tram service.

In July 2007, readers of the Correio Popular newspaper and the Cosmo site in Campinas voted Lagoa do Taquaral as one of the "Seven Wonders of Campinas".

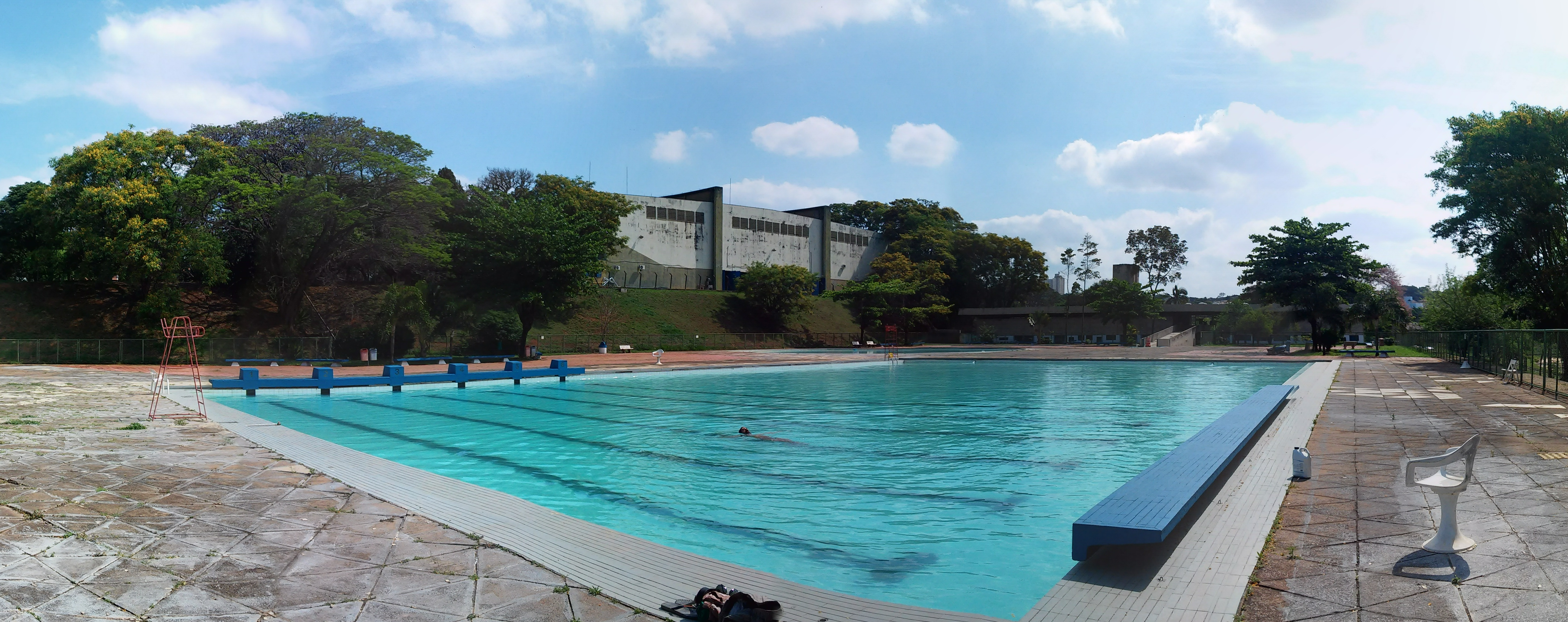
Swimming pools in Parque Portugal's Balneario.
