= Sevkabel =

Russian manufacturing company

- Company type: Private (LLC)
- Industry: Manufacturing, engineering
- Founded: 1879; 147 years ago
- Founder: Carl Heinrich von Siemens
- Headquarters: St.Petersburg, Russia
- Key people: S. V. Yarmilko, General Director
- Products: Power cables
- Net income: 56,228,240 Russian ruble (2007)
- Website: www.sevkab.ru

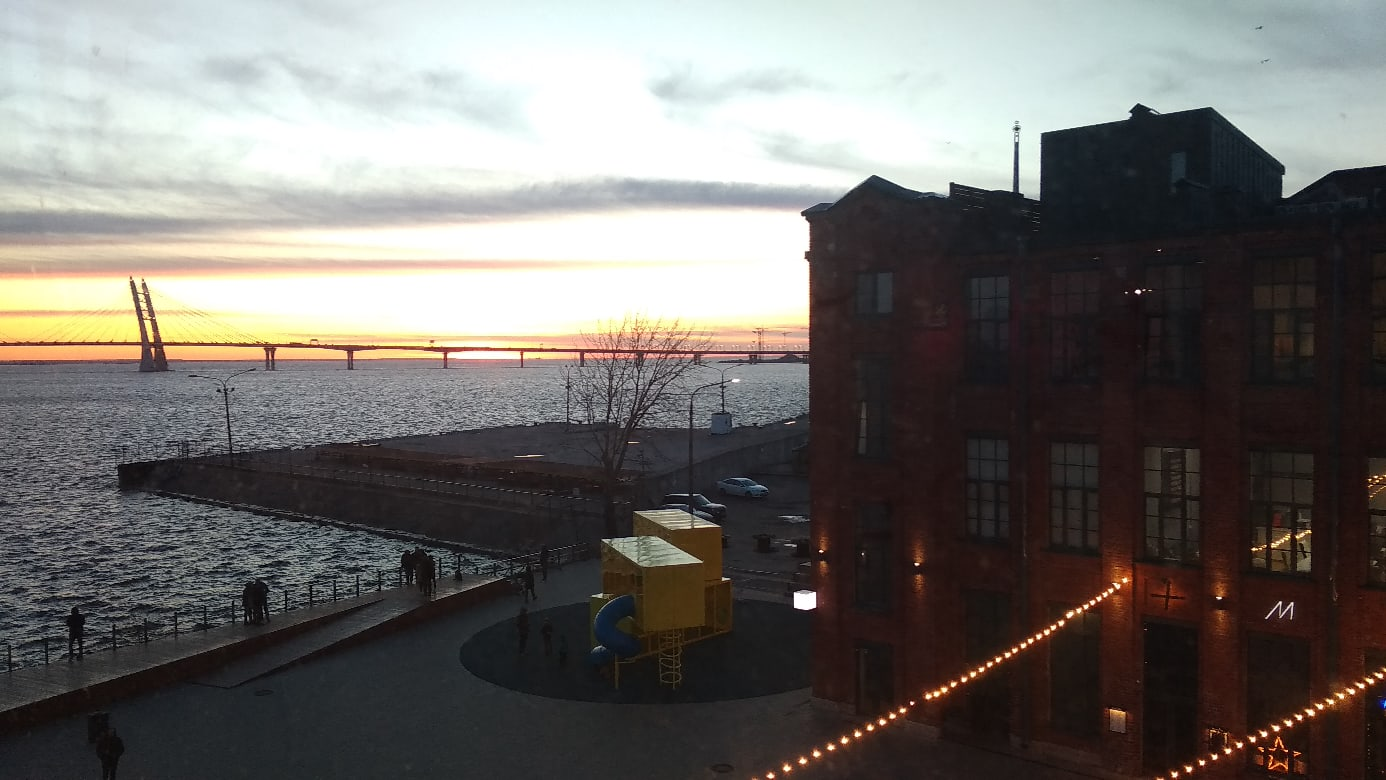
One of the factory buildings in 2020

Sevkabel (Russian: Севка́бель, lit. 'Northcable'), officially Sevkabel Manufacturing Company LLC, is a manufacturer of cable and wire products and the first cable factory in Russia. The main production site and the research institute (Sevkabel Research Institute) are located in Saint Petersburg on Vasilyevsky Island.

== History ==
=== Siemens & Halske ===
In the middle of the 19th century, there was a need for communication technology in Russia: given the size of the country, communication between cities was essential. The close cooperation with Russia provided the newly established Siemens & Halske with consistent orders for 15 years and promoted the company's development.

On 25 October 1879, German engineer Carl Siemens received permission to manufacture insulated wire and telegraph cables in a factory he had established in St. Petersburg.

By 1898, in addition to the cable factory, the company had production of lamps and copper products in Russia. The three businesses were united into Siemens & Halske, the joint-stock company of Russian electrical engineering factories. The established JSC started the reconstruction of the enterprise on Kozhevennaya Street. Instead of wooden constructions, red brick workshops and the factory management building were erected.

In 1913, construction of a new copper factory began at 39 Kozhevennaya Line to transfer production there from Malaya Okhta.

On 1 August 1914, like all other German-owned enterprises, the factory was transferred to state ownership and began working directly with the Military Ministry and the Imperial Navy. Telegraphy, electric lighting, household and industrial products, measuring instruments, indoor and outdoor lighting equipment – all this was provided by the Siemens & Halske cable factory.

In the beginning of 1918, under the Soviet government, the company was renamed once again. According to the resolution of the Supreme Board of the National Economy, it was named Sevkabel, that is, Northern Cable Factory.

=== "Northern Cable Factory" ===
During the Civil War of 1918-1922, the factory continued to operate despite a shortage of raw materials and only 350 employees.

Restoration began in 1922, when the demand for cable products increased significantly in response to the state electrification plan. At that time Sevkabel was the only cable factory in the USSR with its own research facility.

The factory was extensively renovated: workshops were repaired, new machines were bought, and more employees were hired. The factory's products were used in the construction of Volkhovskaya and Dneprovskaya Hydroelectric Power Stations, metallurgical plants in Kuznetsk and Magnitogorsk. Sevkabel also took part in the power supply of Leningrad, in particular, in the construction of the city's first underground oil-filled cable lines.

=== Sevkabel during World War II ===
During World War II, the cable factories promptly changed the course of their work in accordance with the needs of the front. Production of military field wires and communication cables, copper bands for shells, special types of radio frequency cables, etc. began.

Most of the equipment was relocated. Stocks of finished products and technical documentation were sent to the rear on barges. Due to this, production did not stop outside Leningrad. In addition, based on the available equipment and knowledge, centres of high-technology production developed at the relocation sites, from which new factories grew.

From September 1941, the factory became a target of enemy air raids. In total, 300 shells, 6 high-explosive bombs, and 600 incendiary bombs were dropped on the factory during the blockade, dozens of workers were wounded and killed.

In October 1941, Sevkabel produced and laid a communication cable along the bottom of Lake Ladoga under shelling and bombing, and in the summer of 1942, ran a duplicate cable for uninterrupted communication.

After the end of the war, all employees of the factory received the medal "For Valiant Labour in the Great Patriotic War of 1941–1945".

=== Laboratory ===
In 1946, Sevkabel established its own trade school, the first intake of which were teenagers from villages and hamlets of the Orel region.

In 1947, Dmitry Bykov, the factory's chief engineer, became its director. Based on his project, a high-voltage cable testing laboratory, the only one in the USSR at that time, was created on the site of a warehouse that had been burnt down during the bombing.

=== Factory revival ===
In 1948, the country's first continuous vulcanisation facility was created for the manufacture of rubber-insulated sheaths and insulation for shipboard cables. The factory managed to return to its pre-war production level, providing the Moscow Metro with high-voltage cables and equipment, developing and putting into production coaxial underwater communication cables, designing and testing the first 220-kilovolt oil-filled cable.

=== Production association ===
On 9 May 1975, the Pskov Cable Factory and the Research Institute of Cable Industry joined the enterprise on the Kozhevennaya Line, and the Sevkabel production association was established.

Much has been done in 10 years: submarine cable for the Arctic with iceberg protection, production of camera cables for colour TV broadcasting of the 1980 Summer Olympics, 110 kV oil-filled cable with a record length of 1500 m for power supply of sewage treatment facilities on Bely Island, electrical equipment for the Sayano-Shushenskaya and Ust-Ilimsk Hydroelectric Power Stations, construction of the Neva transfer and storage site.

=== Sevkabel in 90s ===
The year 1990 was marked by the establishment of the pilot production facility of the Sevkabel Research Institute and a new workshop for the production of radio frequency and submarine communication cables. Prototypes of optical submarine cables were sent to ocean testing sites, orders were placed by the Ministry of Defence for submarine cable lines on the Black Sea, Gulf of Finland, Pacific Ocean, Neva, Oka, Volga rivers.

=== Sevkabel Holding Company ===
By 2003, the production association became a joint-stock company with a holding structure. More and more enterprises joined the company until 2011.

However, the structure based on borrowed capital could not face intense competition in the industry, was unable to repay the loans, and went into bankruptcy proceedings. As a result, the assets of Sevkabel Holding were transferred under the management of Sevkabel Group.

== Reorganization ==
In 2014, the factory's largest creditor, Bank Saint Petersburg, invited an anti-crisis team led by Alexander Voznesensky to take measures for the stabilisation and development of the company. The team developed a strategy with the following scenarios:

- turnover increase and focus on Sevkabel's key industries
- relocation of production to a region with lower costs
- cessation of activity and sale of assets

The strategy aimed at increasing Sevkabel's turnover in particular niches was supported by the bank.

In the long term, the development and efficiency plan did not exclude mergers with industry players and the relocation of production from the historic centre of Saint Petersburg to a more suitable region for production.

To develop this direction, an agreement was signed in 2017 at the St. Petersburg International Economic Forum between Nikolay V. Taran, who was in control of Rosskat group of companies at the time, and the management team of Sevkabel. The document envisaged the sale of technological equipment to a new legal entity of the Rosskat group of companies for the production of cable products and the subsequent transfer of production to the Samara Region.

For the effective management of the newly established legal entity, as well as further transfer of production, Nikolay Taran decided to involve a team that successfully implemented the strategy developed for Sevkabel in 2014 and ensured recovery from the crisis.

After the implemented merger with the Samara Rosskat group of companies, the combined entity was ranked among the top three cable products manufacturers according to the Cable and Wire Products Manufacturers Association for 2019.

In 2018, there was a de facto change of the significant owner of the Rosskat JSC as a result of the start of the rehabilitation of Promsvyazbank (PSB) PJSC and the transfer of all assets of Promsvyazbank under the management of Trust Bank. PSB was one of the co-owners of the Rosskat group of companies and provided loans to the group secured by shares and stakes of the group's companies.

A non-core asset bank, Trust, became the new significant owner of the group, whose main task was to realise non-financial assets that were on the balance sheets of the bailed-out banks.

In 2019, based on the results of a tax audit of the Rosskat group of companies, the main enterprise of the Rosskat JSC group was charged additional value-added tax in the amount of 1.9 billion roubles for the period of 2013-2015.

In order to fulfil all claims of tax authorities and creditors, Trust Bank decided to conduct bankruptcy proceedings of the Rosskat group of companies in order to sell off the property and equipment of the group's enterprises. For this purpose, the bank needed a guarantor with positive financial indicators. The owners chose Sevkabel, which issued guarantees worth about 3 billion roubles.

Despite the sustainable development, Sevkabel could not fulfill this obligation, and therefore Trust Bank stopped production and put the factory into bankruptcy proceedings.

The Sevkabel team did not share Trust Bank's vision of closing the factory and scrapping the equipment, which affected the outcome of the bankruptcy proceedings. As a result, another strategic direction of the 2015 plan, related to the relocation of production from St. Petersburg to a region with lower costs, was developed. The equipment was moved to the Pskov Region. It increased the production capacity of the SKT Group, which merged with Pskovkabel and a number of other troubled cable manufacturing facilities and became a financial partner of Trust Bank in the Rosskat group bailout process.

As a result of the court-approved settlement agreement, the bankruptcy proceedings were terminated and the claims against the legal entity and the management team were dismissed.

According to SKT Group LLC, 500 million roubles were put into the cable cluster in June 2022, and it is planned to invest more than 2 billion roubles by 2024. The production capacity of the workshops is about 70,000 m^{2}.

== Owners and management ==
General directors of the company:

- Vyacheslav A. Kondratyev — until 1 November 2005.
- Alexey O. Fedotov — from 1 November 2005.
- Yunis T. Ragimov — from February 2008.
- Vyacheslav S. Chentsov — from May 2010.
- Alexander N. Dyatchenko — from 5 October 2010.
- Alexander E. Voznesensky — from 10 September 2014.
- Artem Y. Pidnik — from February 2015.
- Sergey V. Yarmilko — from July 2018 to 2020.

== Notable projects of Sevkabel production association ==
- 1960 – 1961 - First cable glands produced by Sevkabel for the Bratsk Hydroelectric Power Station.
- 1965 - A 330 kV cable and cable glands manufactured for the Pļaviņas HPS, Latvia.
- 1967 - A 220 kV cable. Cable glands and joints for the Saratov HPS.
- 1970 - 110 kV cable glands for the Volga Automotive Plant.
- 1970 - 380 kV cable glands for the Boksberg Power Station, GDR.
- 1973 - Unified 110 kV cable glands for KAMAZ.
- 1974 - 500 kV cable glands for the Toktogul HPS.
- 1975 - 500 kV cable glands for the Ust-Ilimsk HPS.
- 1977 - Electrical equipment for the Sayano-Shushenskaya HPS. A 110 kV oil-filled cable with a record length of 1500 m for power supply of waste water treatment facilities on Bely Island.
- 1978 - Cable glands for 500 kV for Nizhnekamsk HPS. Products for power substation and production of camera cables for colour TV broadcasting of the 1980 Summer Olympics.
- 1979 - Start of production of cables for electrophysical research.
- 1986 - Trial lengths of submarine optical communication cables across the Neva River near the Liteyny Bridge. Design and manufacture of cables for robotic arms that dealt with the aftermath of the Chernobyl Nuclear Power Plant accident.
- 1988 – 1990 - Establishment of pilot production at Sevkabel Research Institute, orders from the Ministry of Defence for submarine cable lines in the Black Sea, Gulf of Finland, Pacific Ocean, Neva, Oka, and Volga rivers.
- 1991 – 1999 - Development and production of a new generation of oil-submersible cables, production of a modern line of low-voltage cables.
