= Vasilyevsky Island =

Island in St. Petersburg, Russia

Vasilyevsky
Native name: Васильевский остров
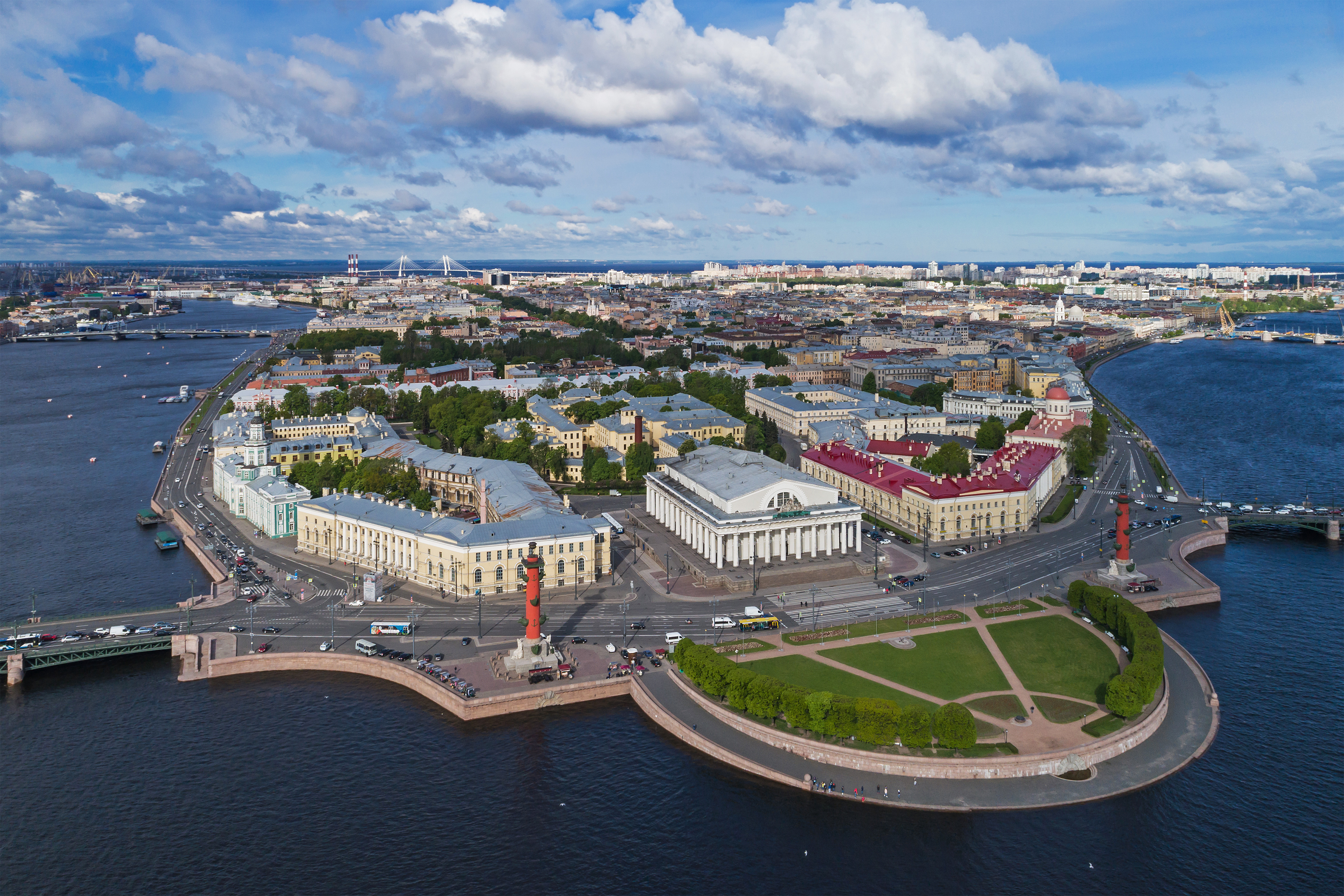
- Aerial view of the spit of Vasilyevsky Island

- Location within Saint Petersburg Location within European Russia Location within Europe

Geography
- Location: Neva Bay, Gulf of Finland
- Coordinates: 59.94°N 30.26°E
- Area: 19.3 km^{2} (7.5 sq mi)

Administration
- Russia
- City: Saint Petersburg

Demographics
- Population: 209,188 (2017)
- Pop. density: 10,833/km^{2} (28057/sq mi)
- Ethnic groups: Russians

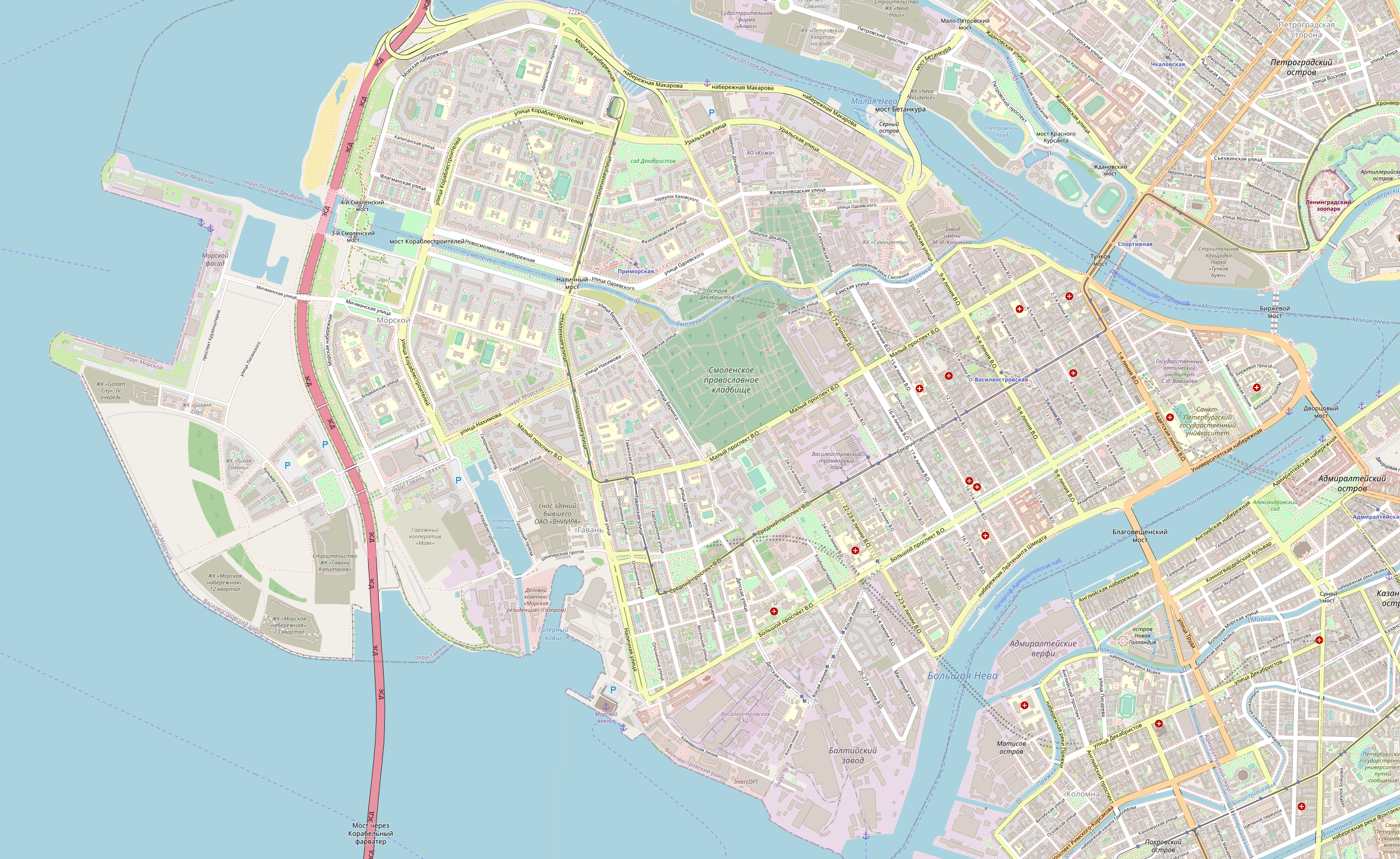
Vasilyevsky Island in St. Petersburg

Vasilyevsky Island (Russian: Васи́льевский о́стров, Vasilyevsky Ostrov, V.O.) is an island in St. Petersburg, Russia, bordered by the Bolshaya Neva and Malaya Neva Rivers (in the delta of the Neva River) in the south and northeast, and by Neva Bay of the Gulf of Finland in the west. Vasilyevsky Island is separated from Dekabristov Island by the Smolenka River. Together they form the territory of Vasileostrovsky District, an administrative division of Saint Petersburg.

Situated just across the river from the Winter Palace, it constitutes a large portion of the city's historic center. Two of the most famous St. Petersburg bridges, Palace Bridge and Blagoveshchensky Bridge, connect it with the mainland to the south. The Exchange Bridge and Tuchkov Bridge across the Malaya Neva connect it with Petrogradsky Island. Vasilyevsky Island is served by Vasileostrovskaya and Primorskaya stations of Saint Petersburg Metro (Line 3). There are plans to build new Metro stations on Vasilyevsky Island by extending Line 4 (the Orange Line) to the Island. In addition, the island is serviced by bus routes and tramway lines.

== History ==
Originally, planners wanted Vasilyevsky Island to have canals in lieu of streets (similar to Venice). However, this plan never came to fruition and today the island has streets.

== Etymology ==
Speakers of Russian understand the name of the island as a possessive adjective made of the Russian masculine personal name Vasily (Basil), or possibly of the family name Vasilyev (derived from "Vasily").

There are various versions of who the original Vasily was, though these may be a product of false etymology, as the Russian name of the island may in fact be a corruption of its previous Swedish or Finnish name, because the island had been shown under them on Swedish maps before its present Russian history began after the Great Northern War.

First Russian record of the island, and under virtually its modern name, is found in a registry book of 1500 land survey (Pistsovaya kniga) of Votes' Pyatina (Vodskaya Pyatina) of Novgorod Republic.

It makes less probable another, a later one, Vassily-related etymology dating back to the 18th century. It is connected, like many other city legends, with the person of the founder of the present-day city, Peter the Great. One of his foremost gunner officers and military engineers, some Vassily Korchmin, had his artillery battery to ward off the Swedish navy at the spit of the island and got the tsar's letters addressed "To Vassily in the Island", thus making it another possible cause of the island's name. The man was commemorated by a lively statue in a pedestrian street on the island (see photo). Finnish etymology may lead to a corrupted compound word Vasikkasaari, Calf Island. Another known Finnish name of the island was Hirvisaari - Elk (Moose) Island.

== Topography ==
Geographically, the island consists of two main parts. The south and east of the island are old, with buildings mostly from the 19th century. The southern embankment (with its western part named after St Petersburg University located there) has some of the oldest buildings in the city dated from 18th century. That part of the island is notable for its rectangular grid of streets (originally intended to be canals, like in Amsterdam), with three lengthwise thoroughfares called prospekts – Bolshoi (Big), Sredniy (Middle) and Maly (Small) – going roughly from east to west, and with about 30 crosswise Linii (Lines) forming about 15 peculiarly numbered streets going perpendicularly from south to north. The island boasts the city's narrowest street named after the artist Ilya Repin.

== Landmarks ==
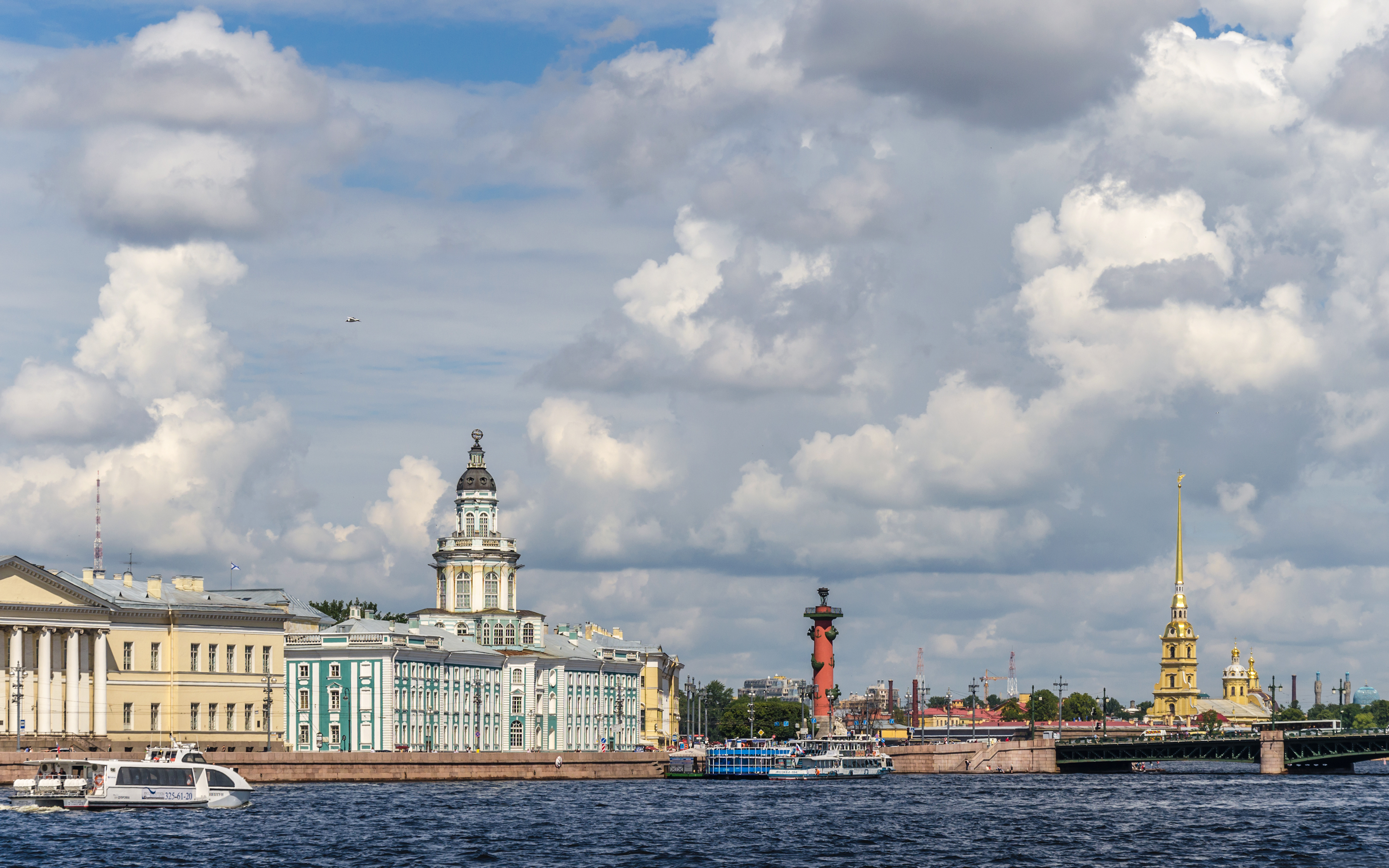
Spit of Vasilyevsky Island. View to Universitetskaya Embankment, Kunstkamera museum and Peter and Paul Fortress

The easternmost tip of the island, called Strelka (spit, literally Arrow), features a number of museums, including the Old Saint Petersburg Stock Exchange (Bourse) as well as two Rostral columns, and is a popular tourist attraction. The edifices lining the Universitetskaya Embankment along the Bolshaya Neva include the Kunstkamera, Twelve Collegia, Menshikov Palace, Imperial Academy of Sciences, and St. Andrew's Cathedral – all dating from the 18th century. In the island center there is a considerable Museum of electrical transport organised by transport history enthusiasts. It is based at the oldest Vasileostrovsky tram depot. Another recent notable attraction was an animated floating anchored illuminated musical fountain located just off the Spit.

In contrast with the Neva embankments in the historical center, the western part of the island was developed much later, in the late Soviet times, and has mostly typical Soviet apartment blocks. A monument to Vasily, the legendary Peter I's local gunners' battery commander after whom the island may have been named, was opened in 2003.

The principal buildings of Saint Petersburg State University are located on the island and include the Twelve Collegia by Domenico Tresini (1722–44) and the former palace of Peter II of Russia.

== Economics, science and culture ==
In recent centuries, Vasilyevsky Island has provided a home both to academic life and to various industries.

=== Science and education ===
The island's learning facilities have included the Imperial Academy of Sciences with its copious library, Saint Petersburg State University (including their Russian Language and Culture Institute), the 1st Army Cadet Corps (later the Military Academy of Supplies and Logistics) and the Naval Cadet Corps, and (among newer bodies) the Civil Service Academy (now termed the North-West Institute of the Russian Presidential Academy of National Economy and Public Administration). Many of these entities occupy historically significant buildings (for example, the Saint Petersburg Mining Institute).

The Russian Academy of Sciences with its branches has always had many of its research institutions in its cradle - on the island. They include the institutes of: soils study, zoology, optics, aerial photography, Precambrian and general geology, polymers, world ethnography and anthropology, physiology, chemistry of silicate and fireproof compounds. Possibly best-known of the institutes, the Institute of Russian Literature (known as Pushkin House, named after poet Pushkin) holds manuscripts and archives of Russian prominent writers of the past and of the present.

A number of institutions maintain museums, some of them open to the general public. Several require neither obligatory pre-booking nor pre-arranging groups-only visits (like Kunstkamera and the Zoological Museum of the Zoological Institute of the Russian Academy of Sciences). Others require pre-organised visits, like the Literary Museum at Pushkin House or the Soils Study Museum of the Russian Academy of Agricultural Sciences.

=== Industries ===
The island, like many other areas located around the city centre, has had a number of well-developed industries and factories, ranging from shipbuilding to making pianos and to industrial bread baking.

Now, in a supposedly post-industrial era, a number of buildings of former factories have been converted to other usages, like the former Jacob Becker's Piano Factory.

Energy supply to many industrial facilities and housing in the island is provided by a cogeneration thermal power station.

One of three biggest Saint Petersburg shipyards is Baltiysky Zavod (Балтийский завод - Rus. for Baltic Shipyard) based in the island. Having had in recent years some financial difficulties, now it is recovering. There are private developers' plans to relocate the factory to Kronshtadt to make way for housing development schemes.

Another redevelopment spot is claimed to change part or all of the site of former Steel-rolling Plant (Staleprokatniy zavod - Rus. Сталепрокатный завод), presently known as Saint Petersburg Precision Alloys Foundry (Peterburgskiy zavod pretsezionnykh splavov).

Until recently, all of Saint Petersburg Metro escalators as well as those for all the underground railroad systems of the former Soviet Union were made since the 1950s at a local facility called Zavod "Eskalator", now known as LATRES (Rus. abbr. ЛАТРЭС). Now they produce moving staircases for shopping malls around Russia as well.

A major producer of electric power and signal cables is Sevkabel (Rus. for North(ern) Cable (Factory)). Traditionally a branch of metal-processing, this industry now also includes production of optic fibre.

Marine and consumer electronics have been designed and produced at a number facilities in the island (see e.g. Russian Institute for Power Radioengineering:), one of them being a nationalized Siemens & Halske plant that was known in the Soviet times as (Nikolay) Kozitsky Plant making Raduga (Rus. for rainbow) colour television sets. Now it is a Raduga group company.

Like every other district of Saint Petersburg in the Soviet times, the island has had its own industrial bakery (Rus. khlebozavod хлебозавод) - Vasileostrovskiy khlebozavod, now a subsidiary of Fazer Group.

=== Churches ===
The Lutheran Church of Saint Michael was built on the island in 1874–1876.

== In popular culture ==
=== Literature ===
- A Lonely Cottage on the Vasilyevsky Island, by Alexander Pushkin
- Cemetery of the Smolensko Church. is a poem by Letitia Elizabeth Landon about an annual mourning feast held in the Smolensky Cemetery on the graves of the deceased. This illustrates a painting by Alfred Gomersal Vickers, engraved by E. Smith, in Fisher's Drawing Room Scrap Book, 1837.
- Poor Folk, by Fyodor Dostoevsky

== Image gallery ==
Images of Vasilyevsky Island
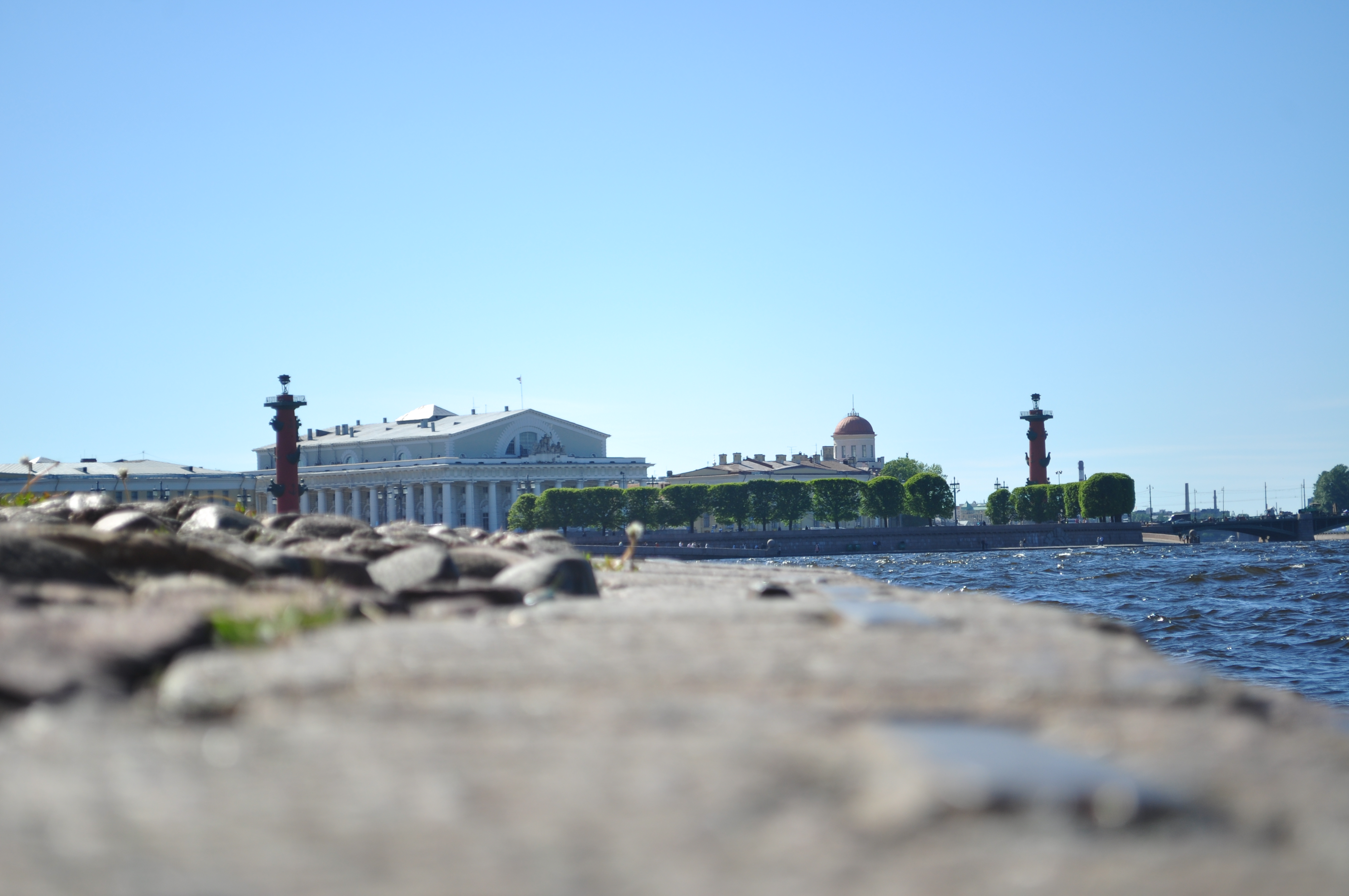

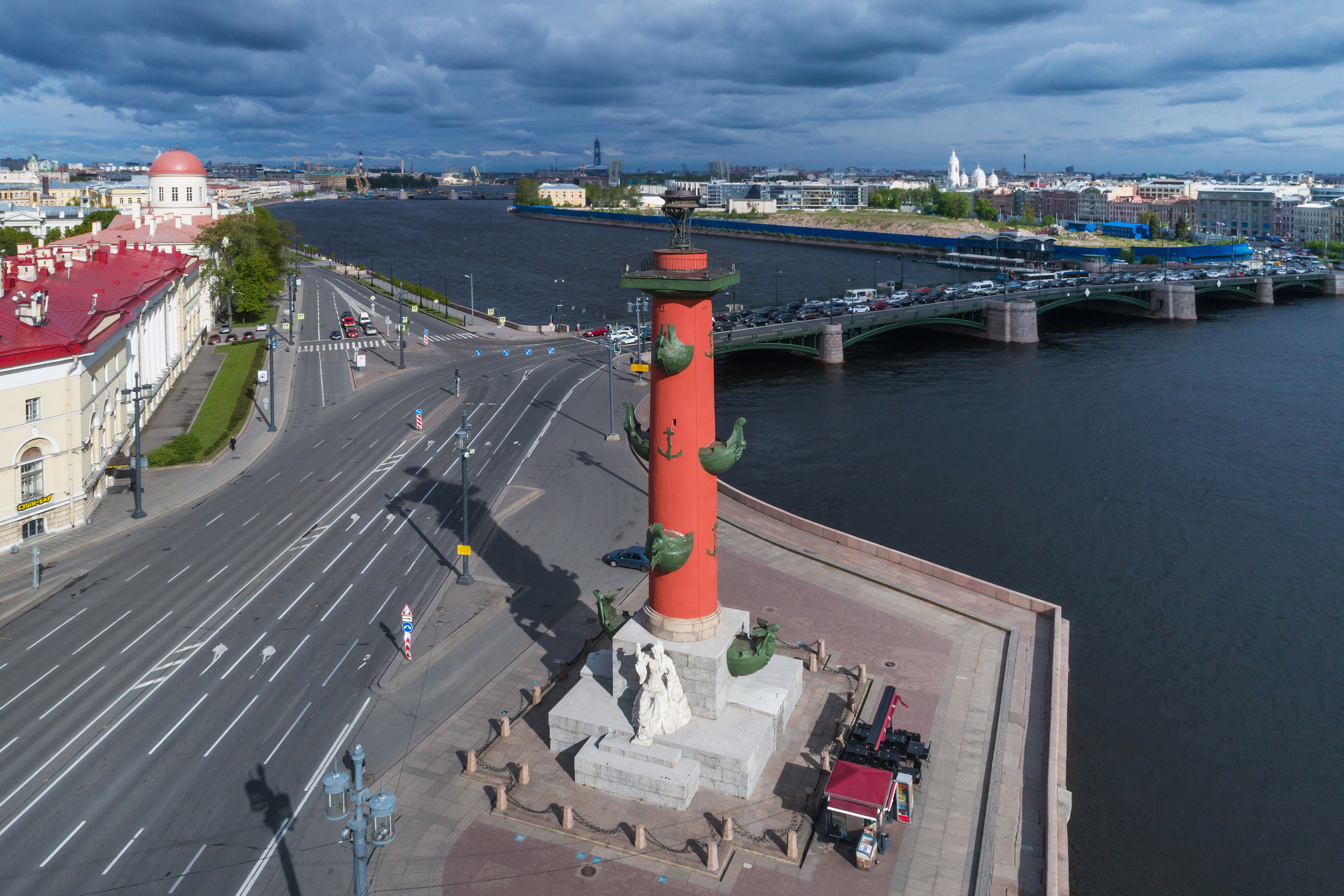

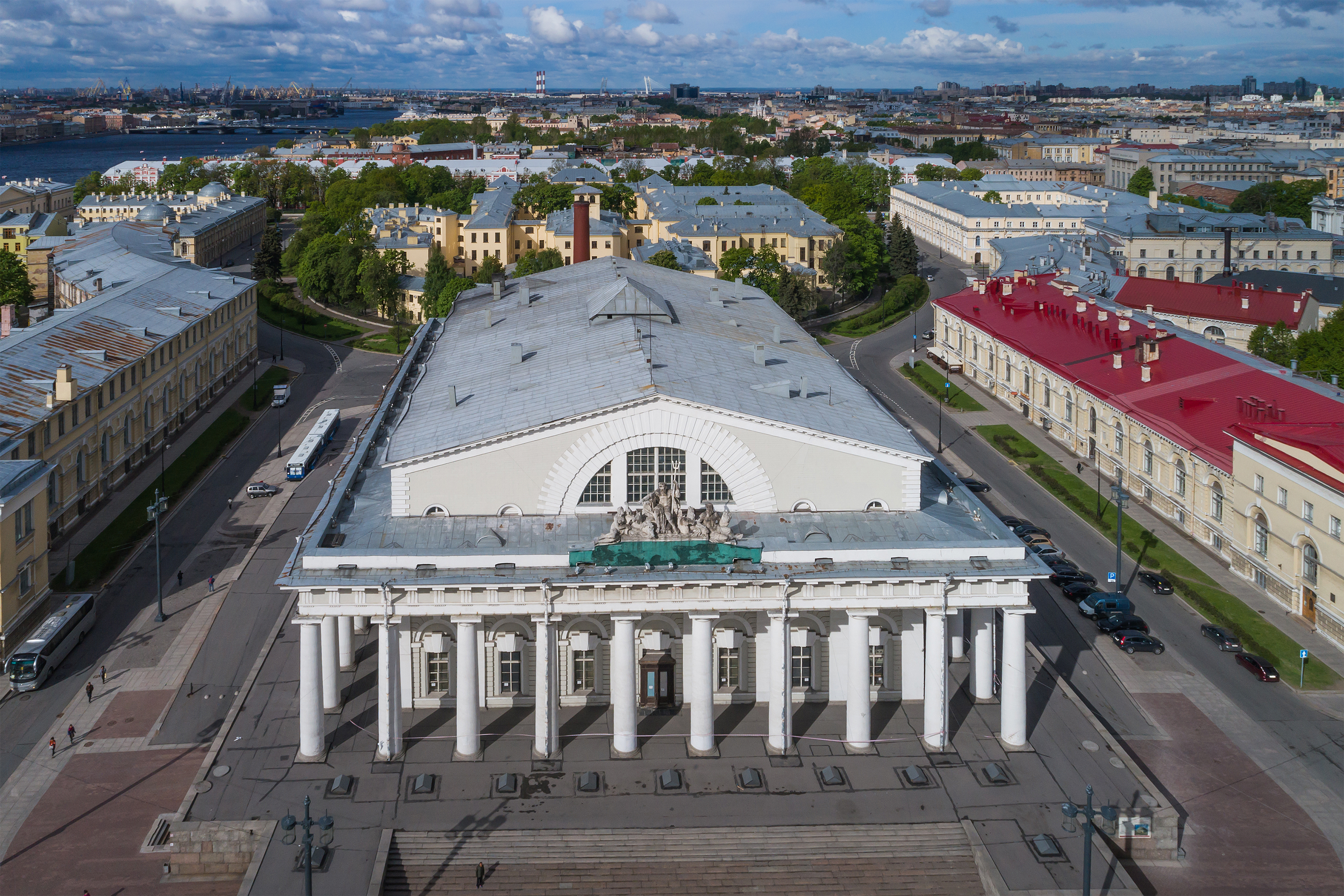

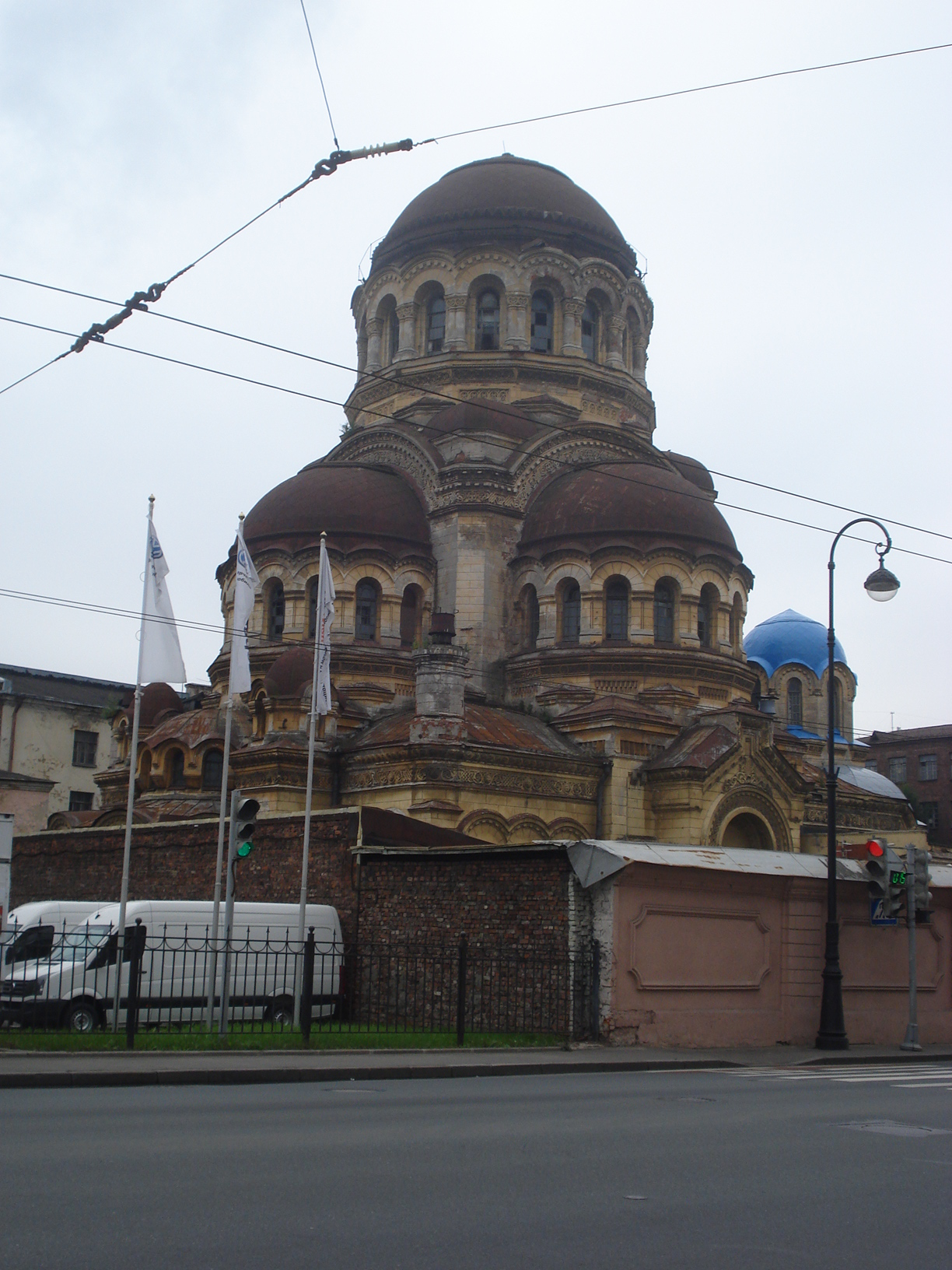

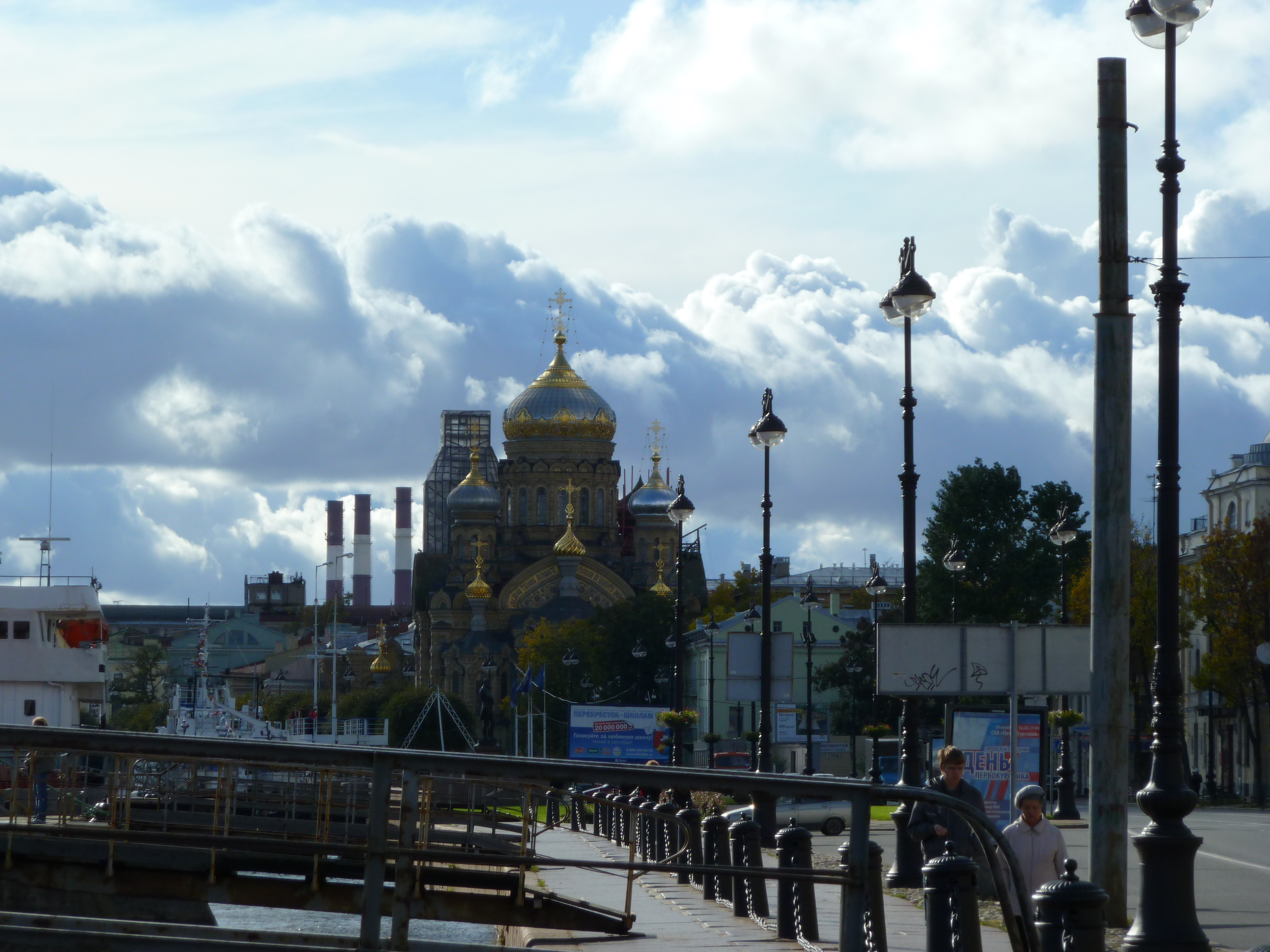

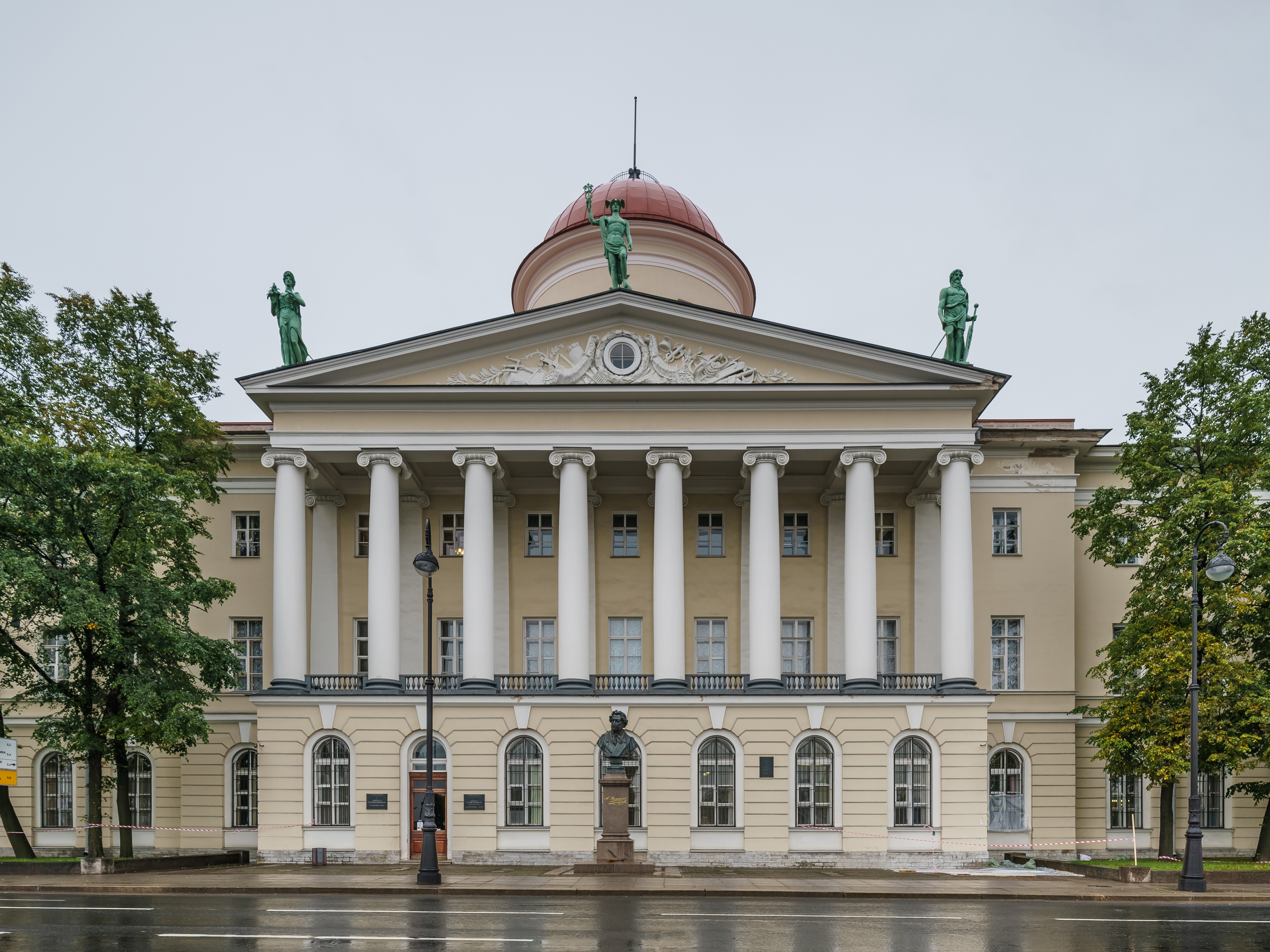

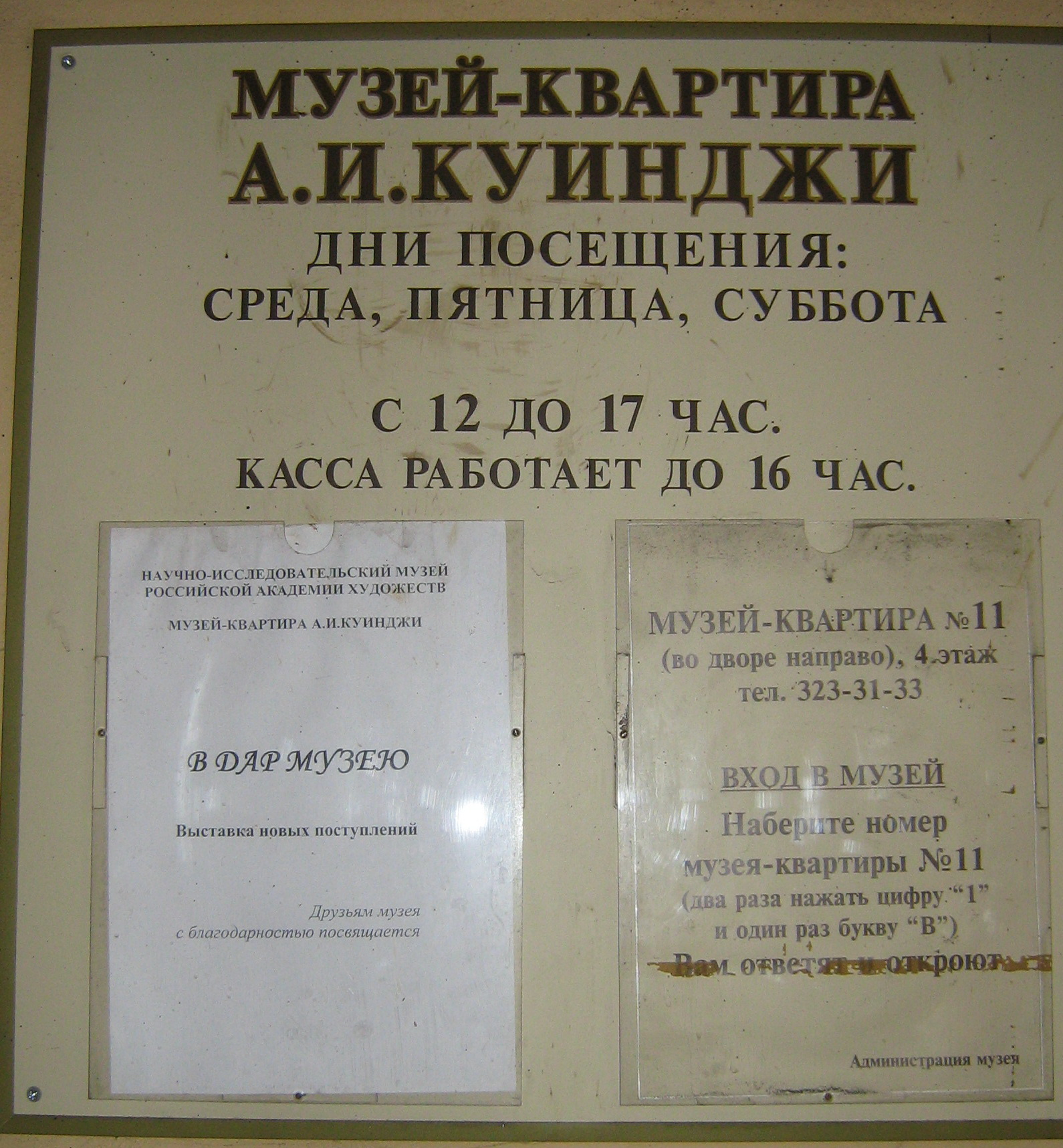

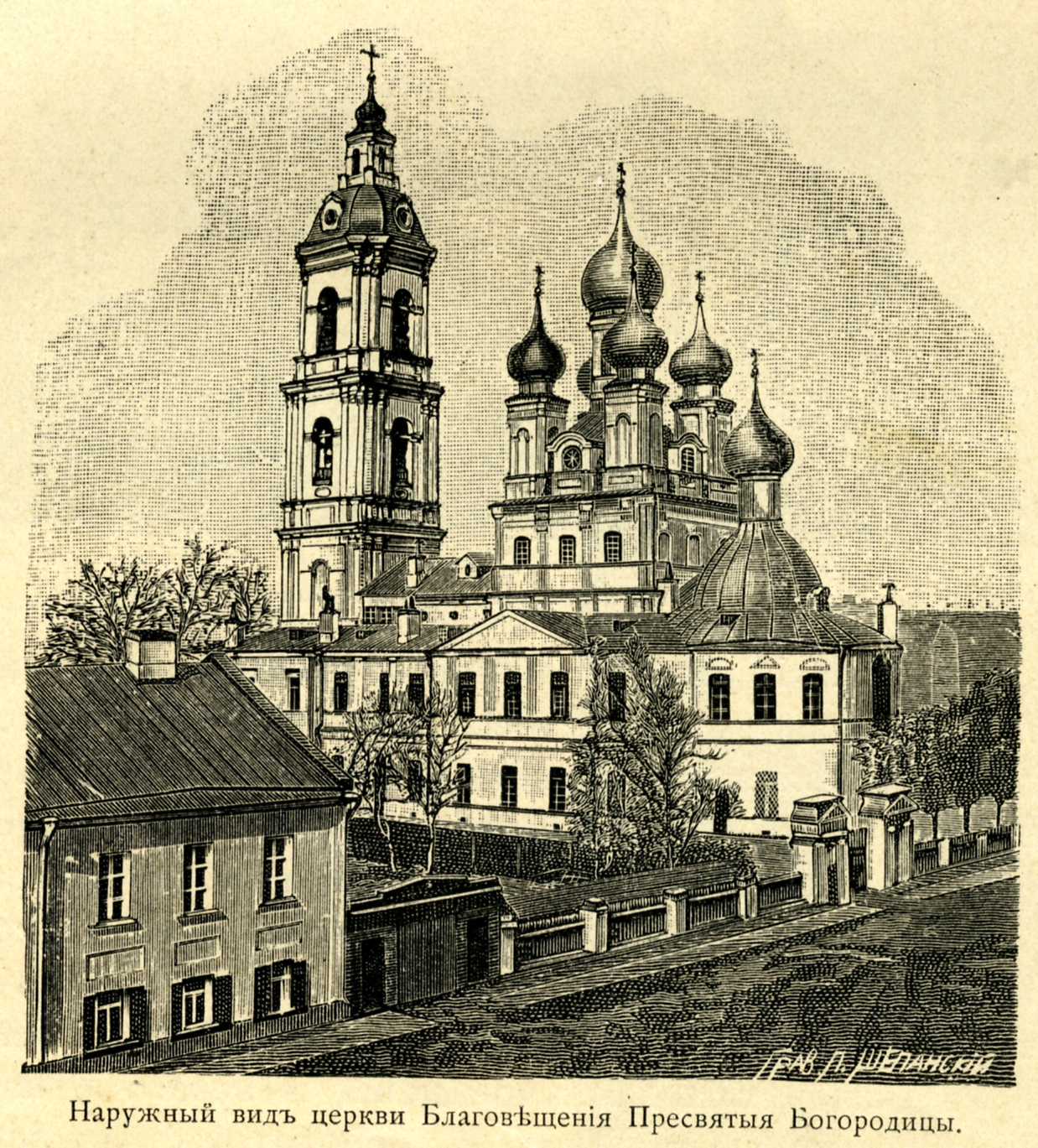

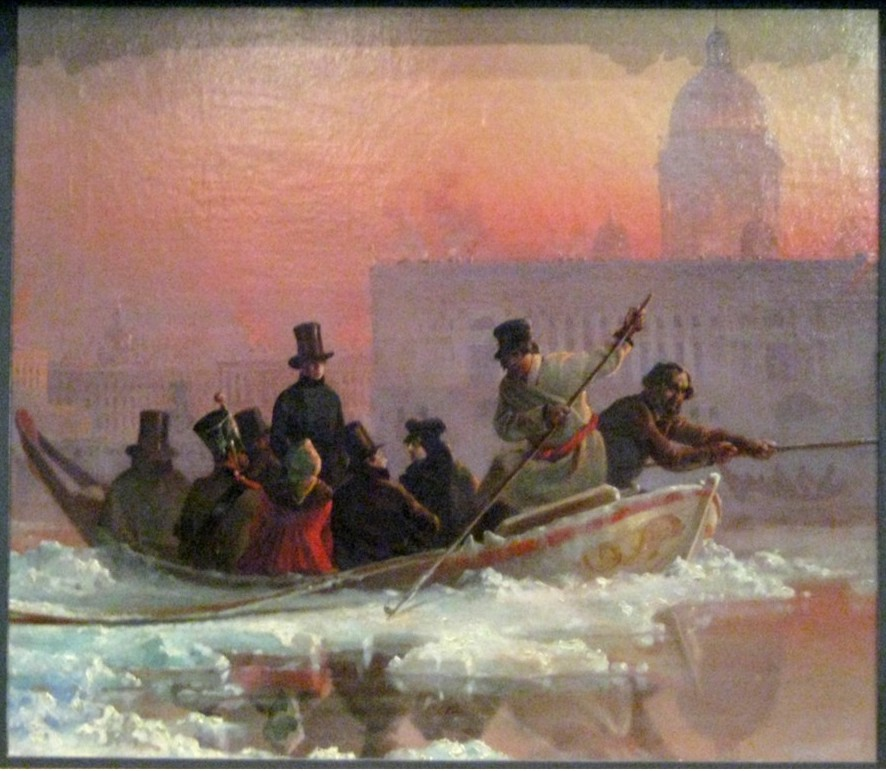

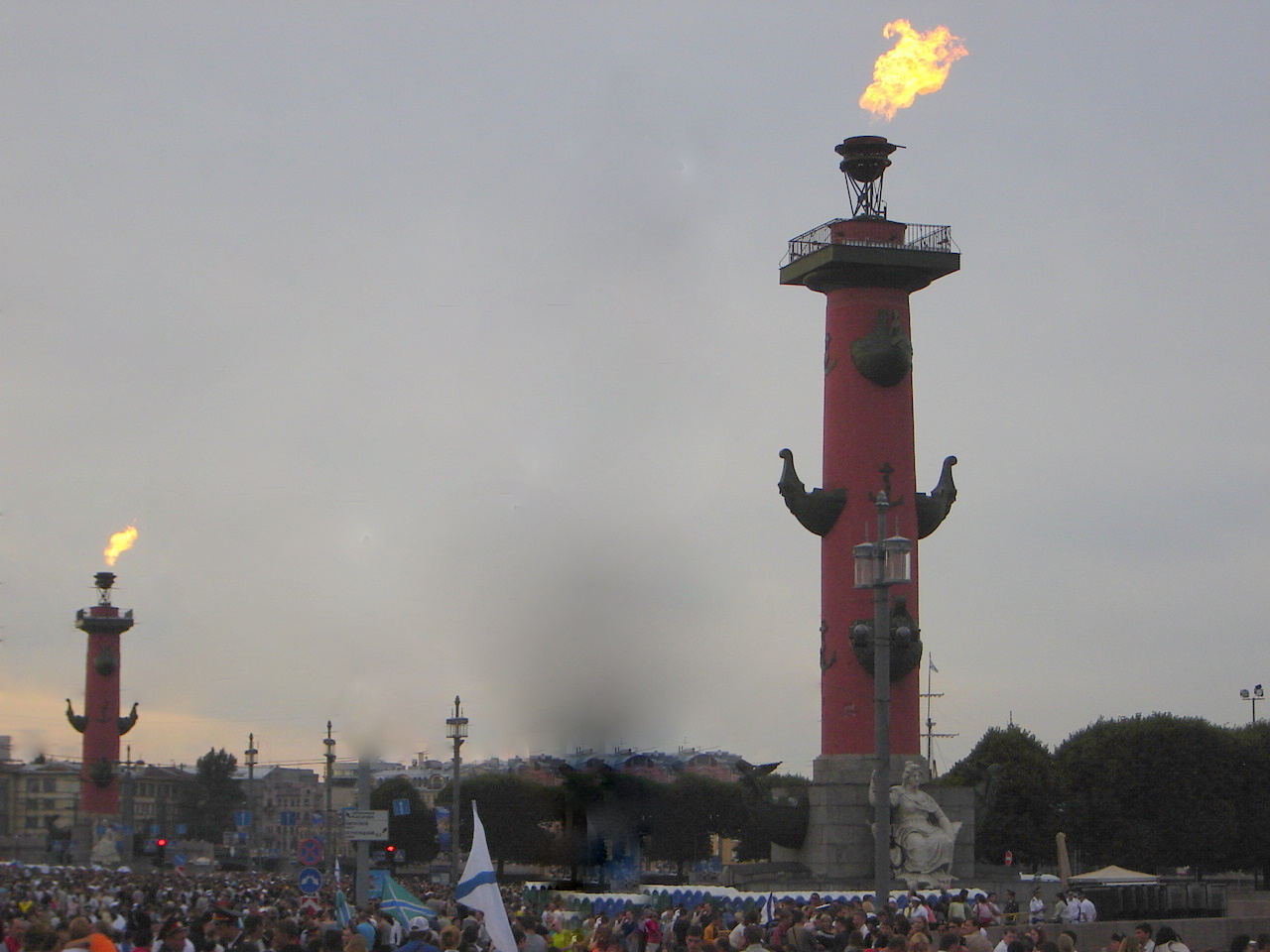

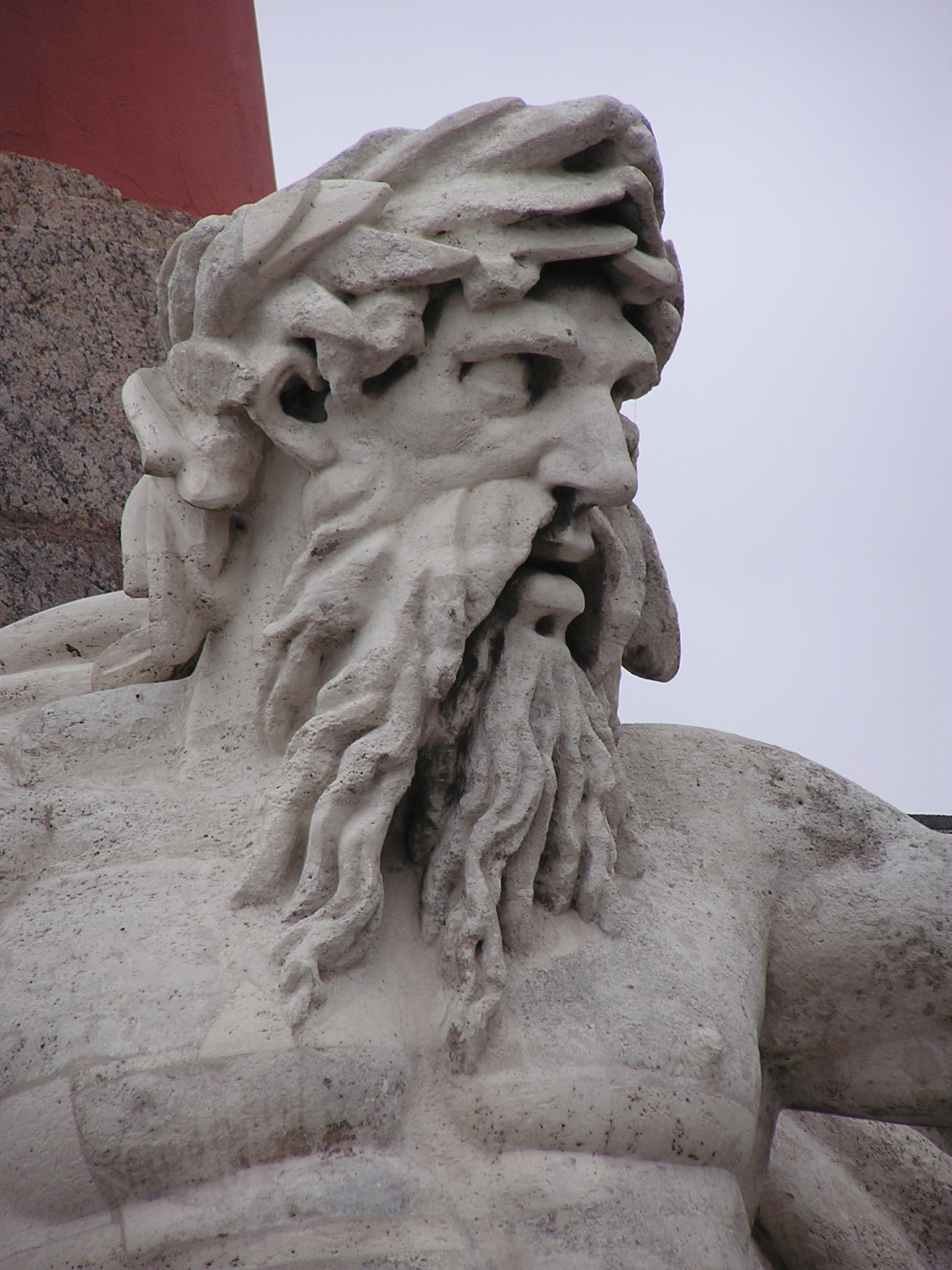

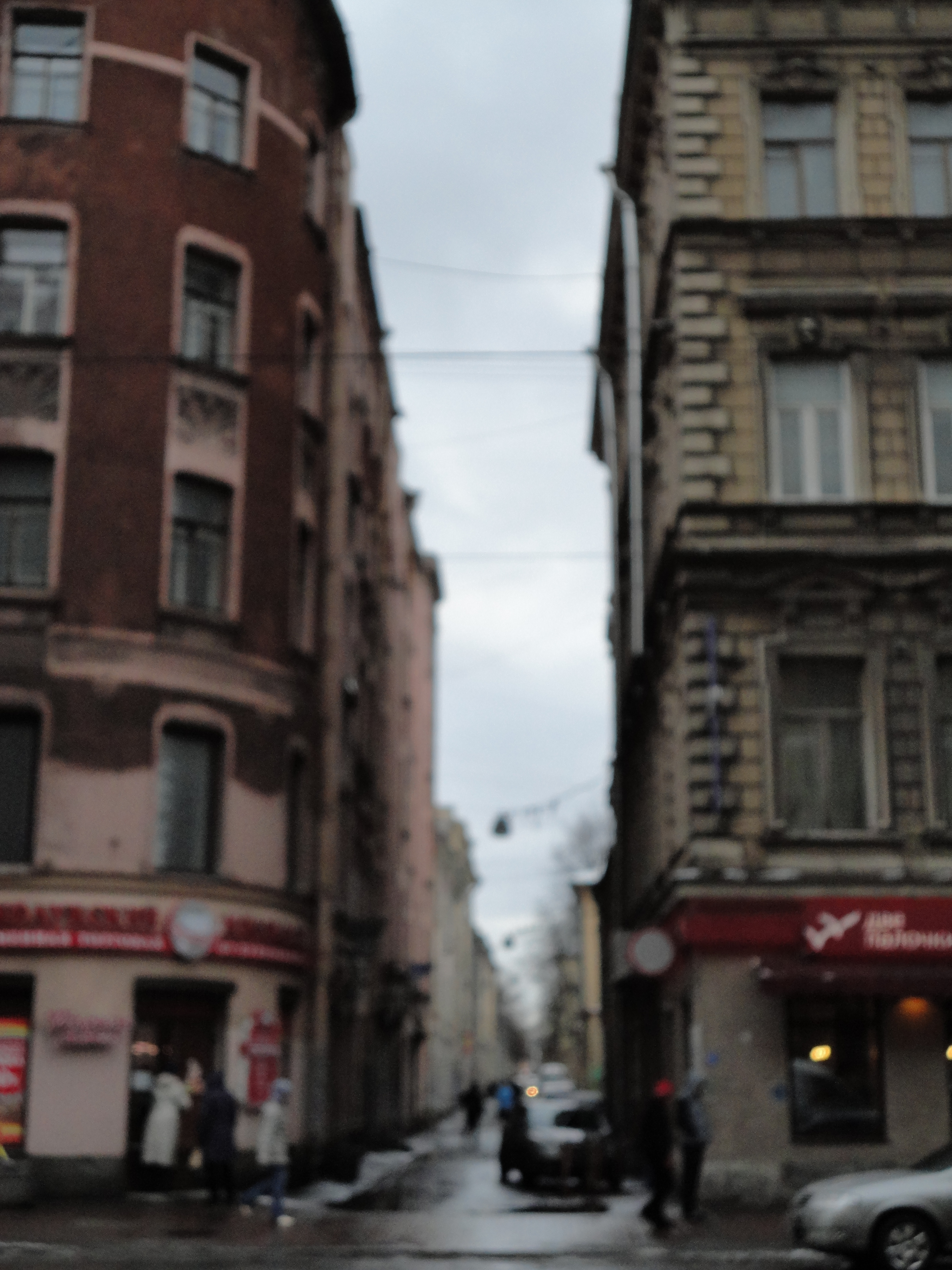

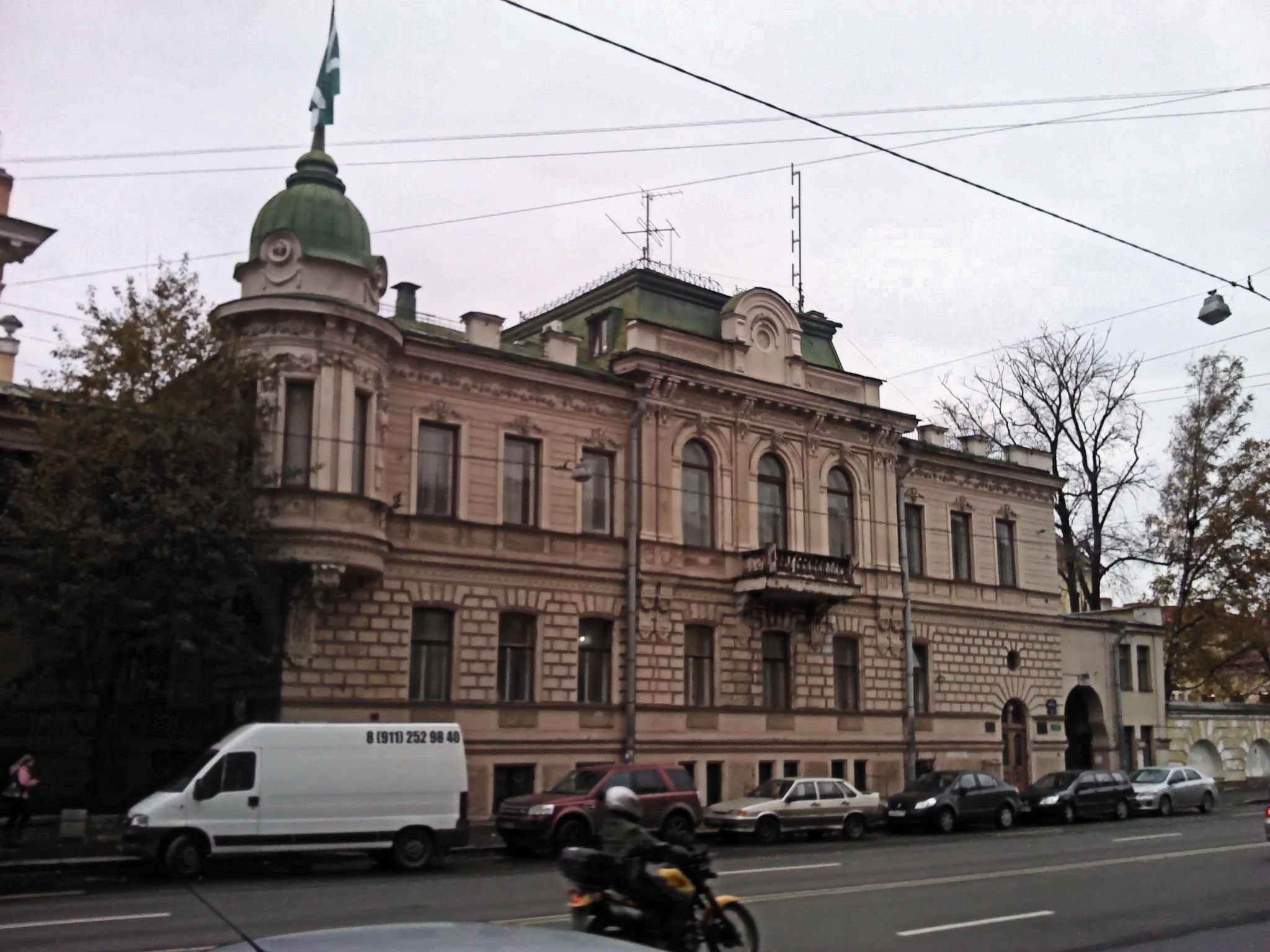

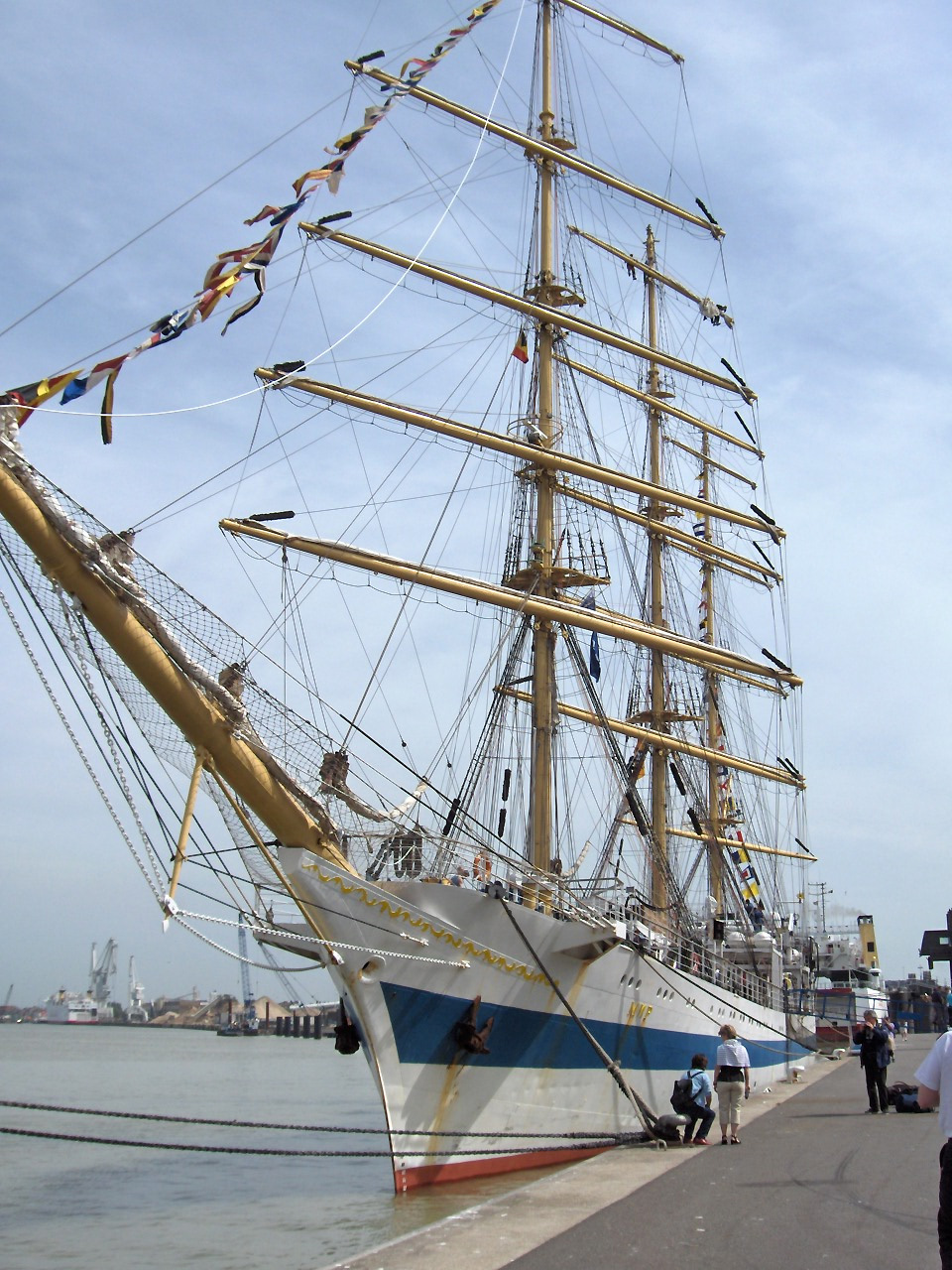

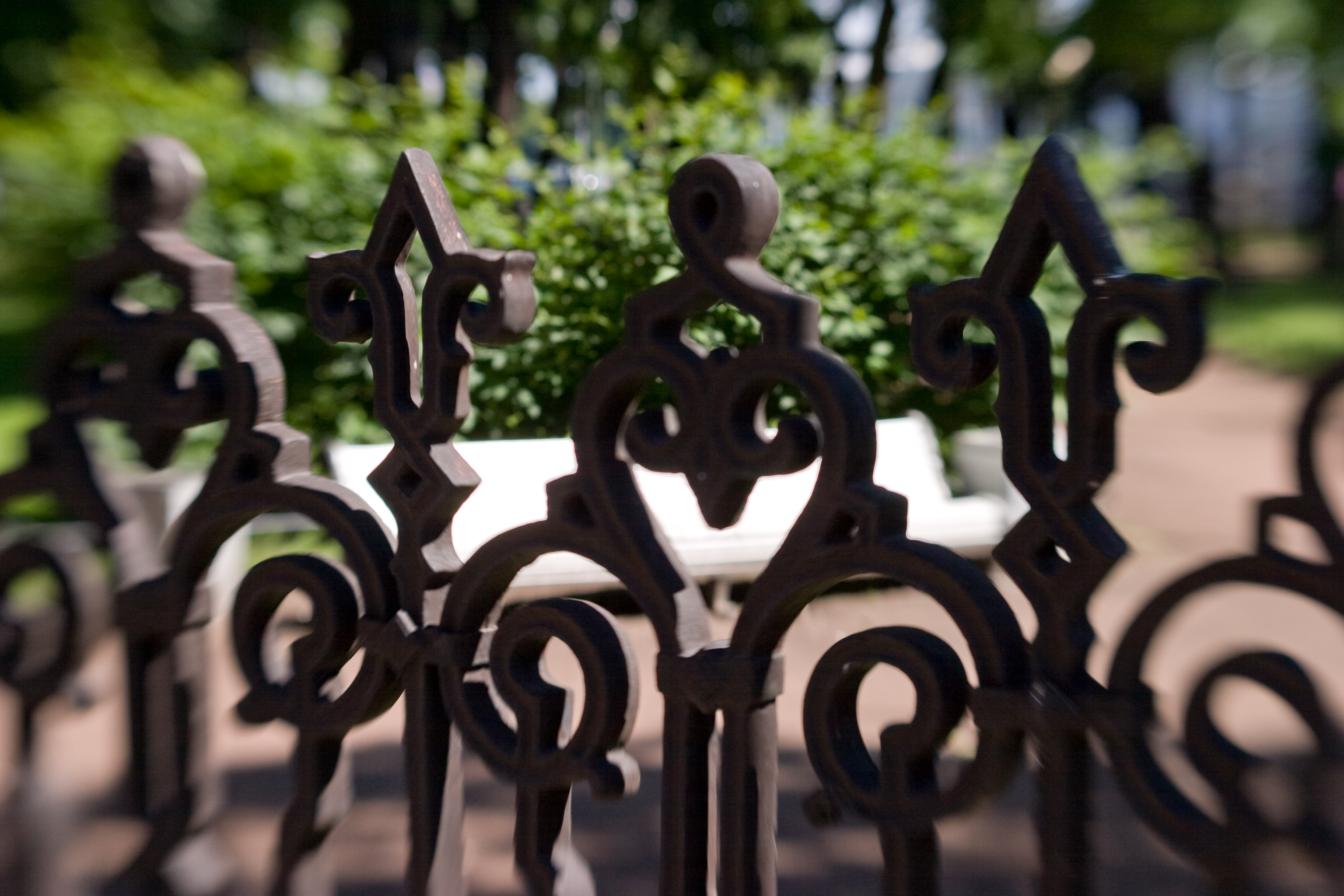

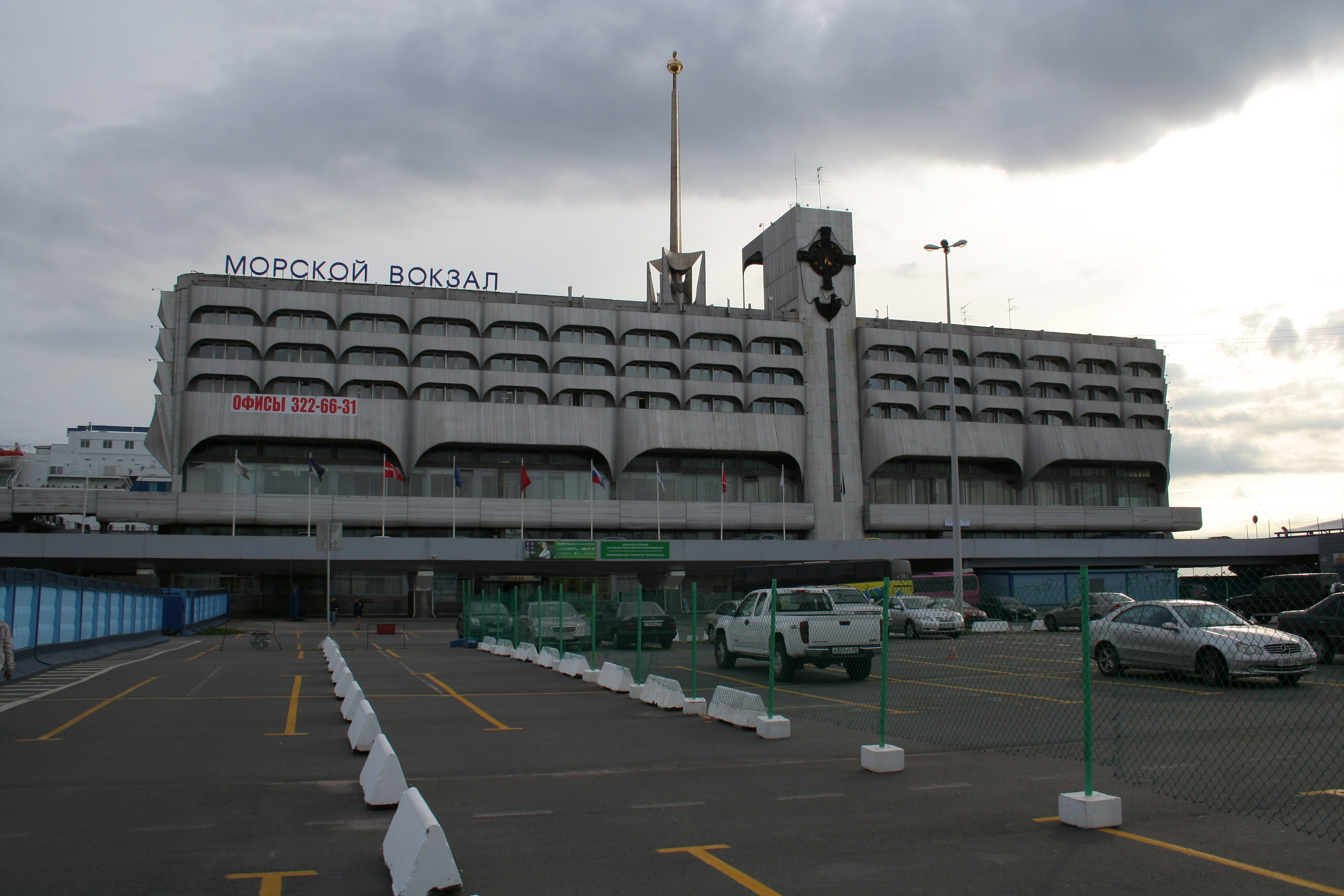

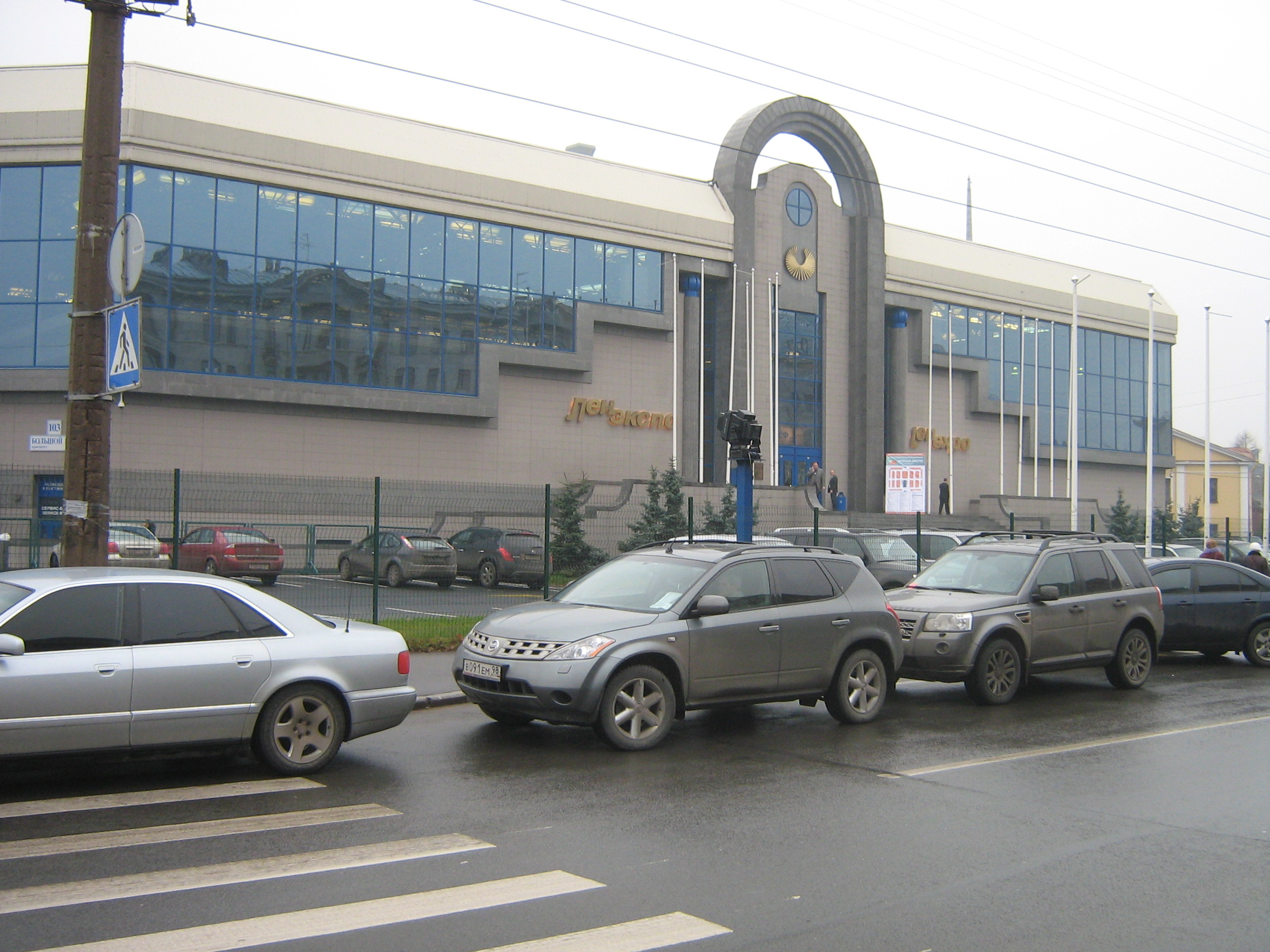

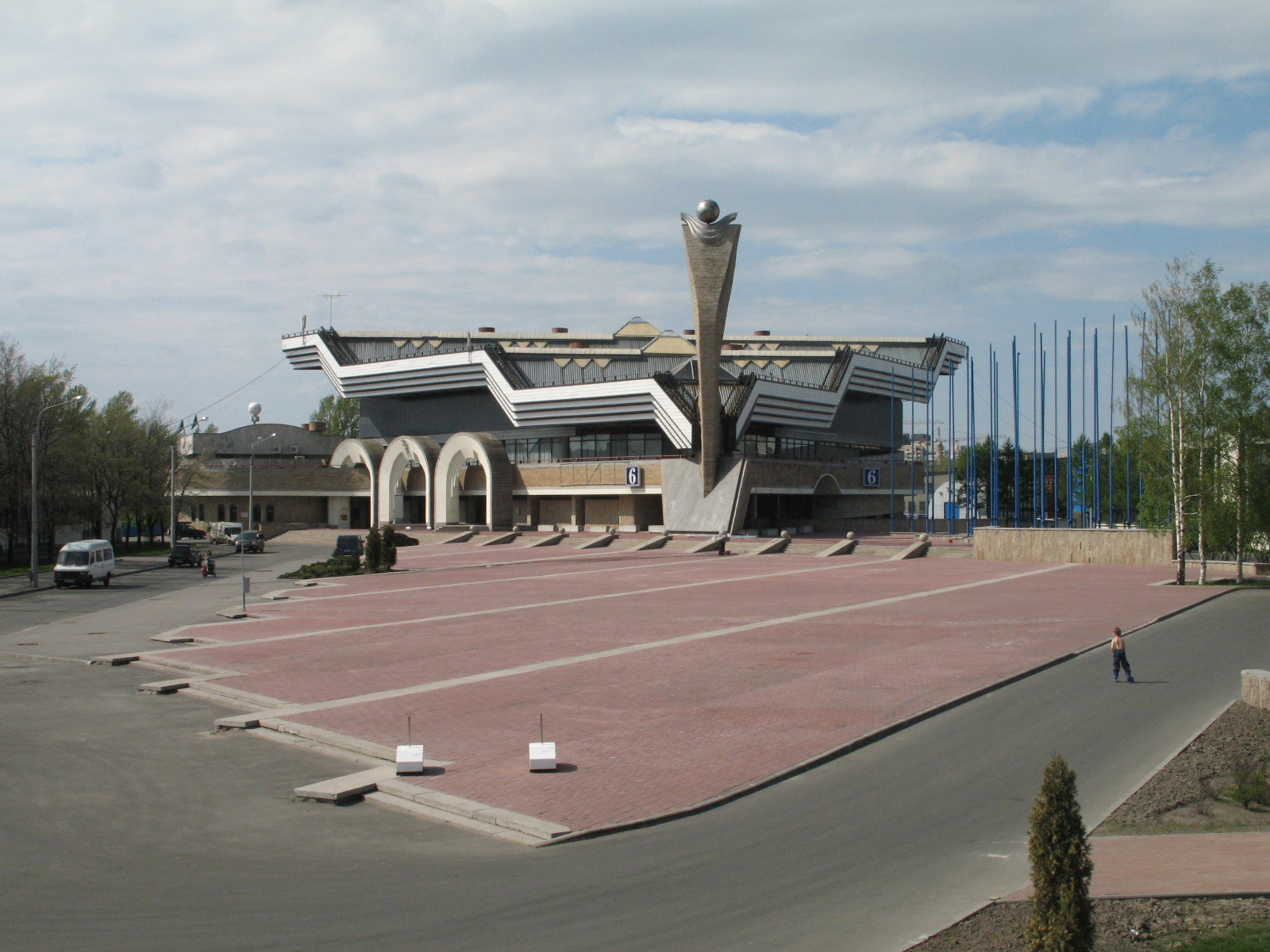

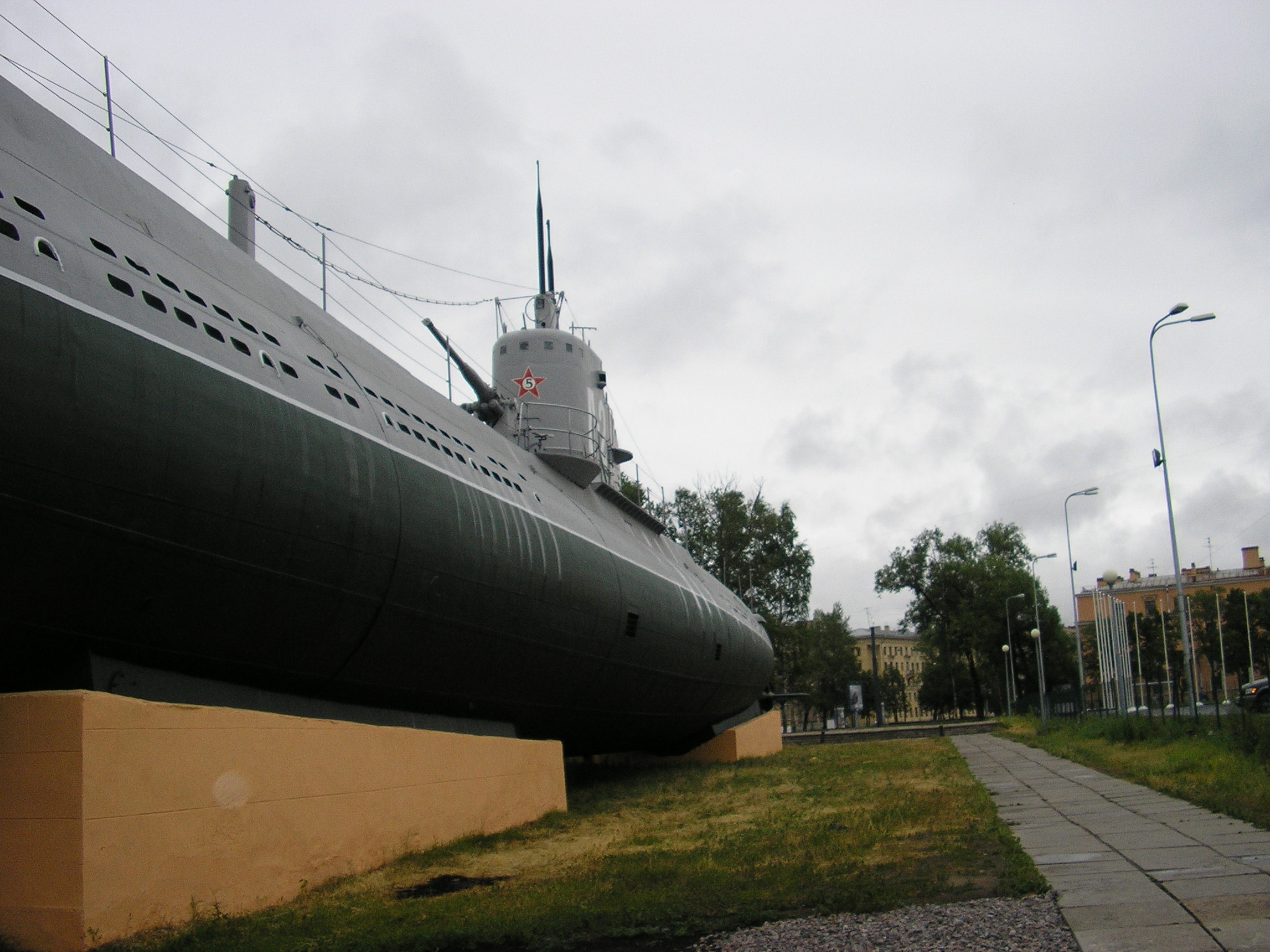

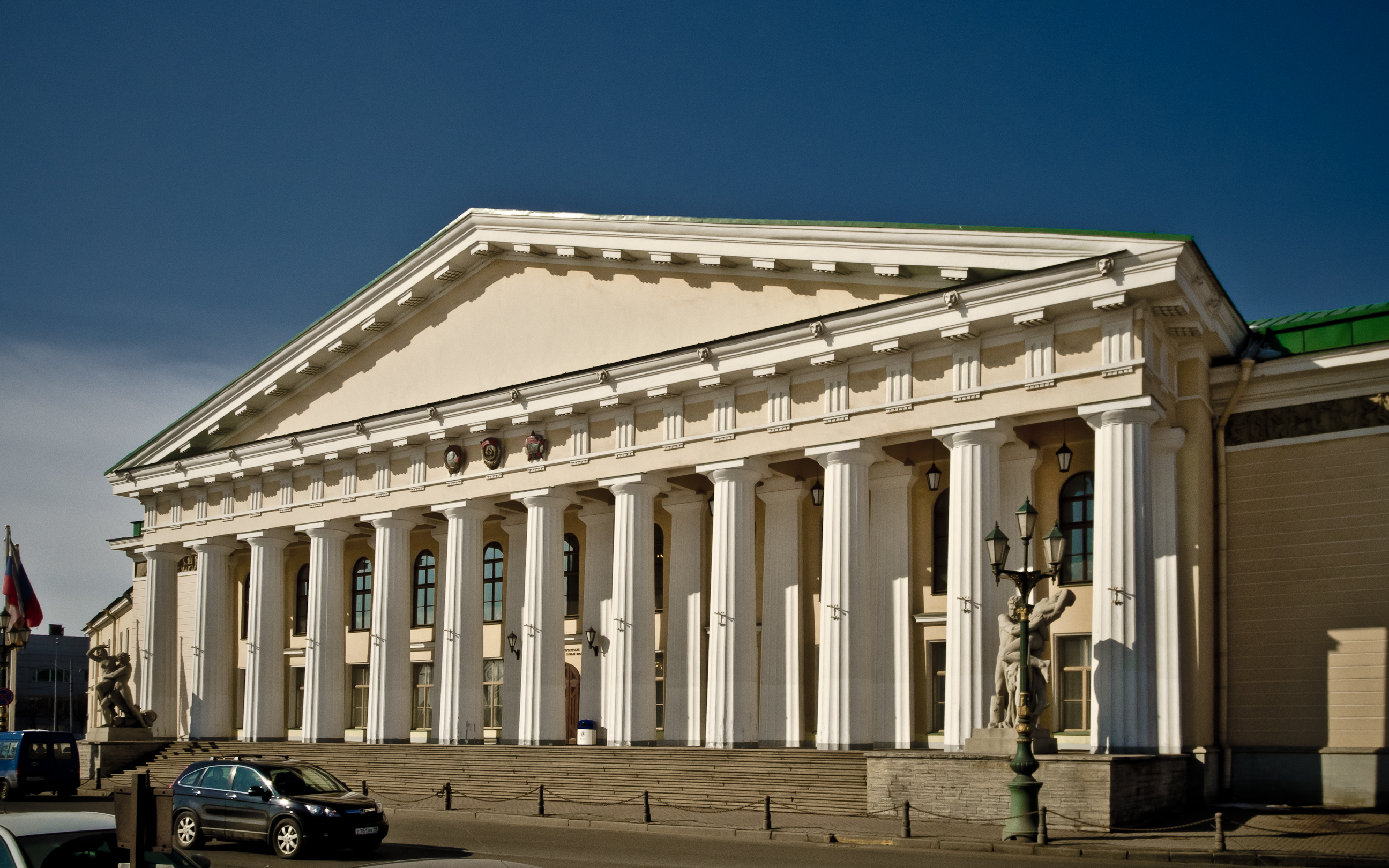

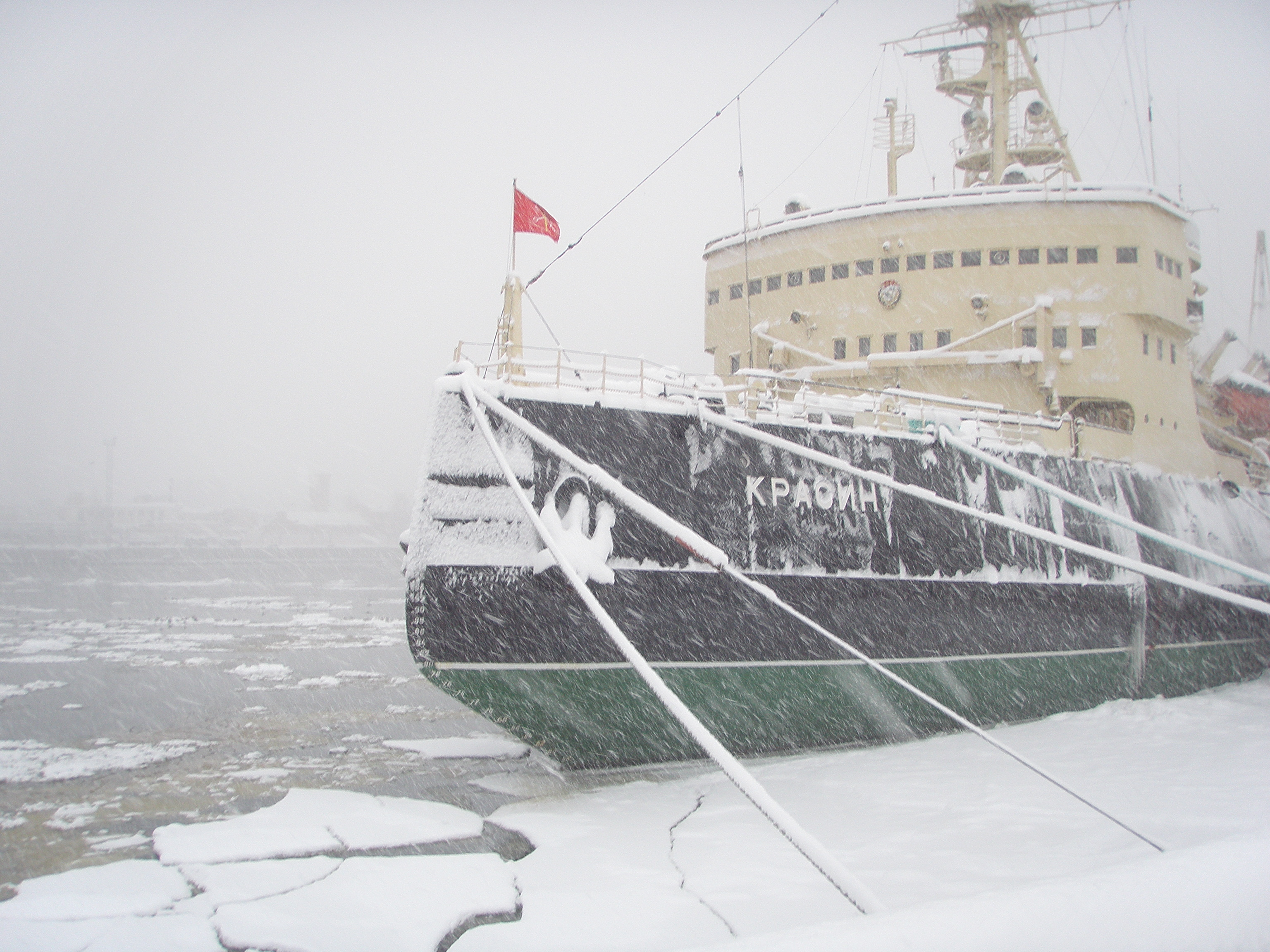

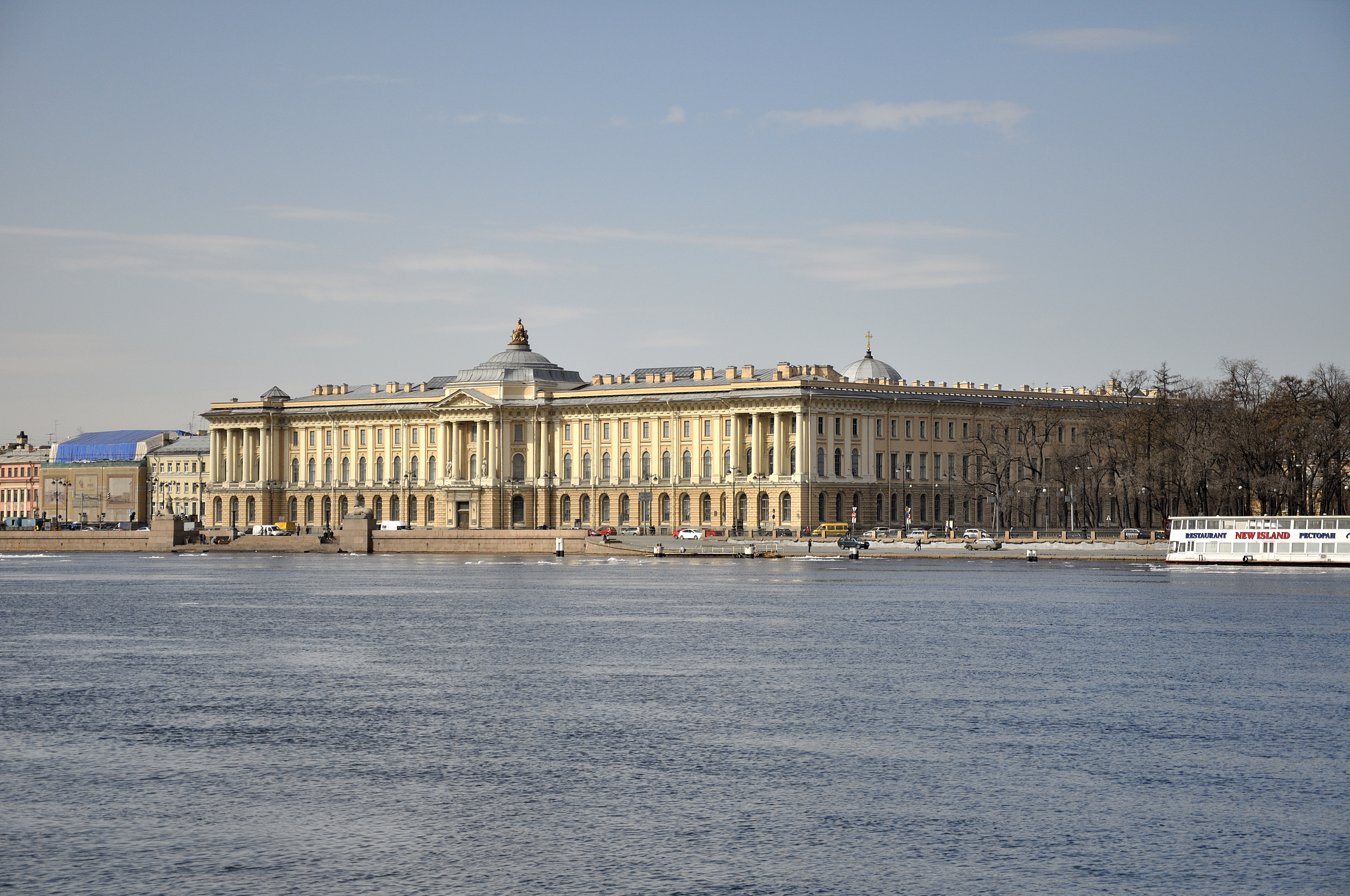

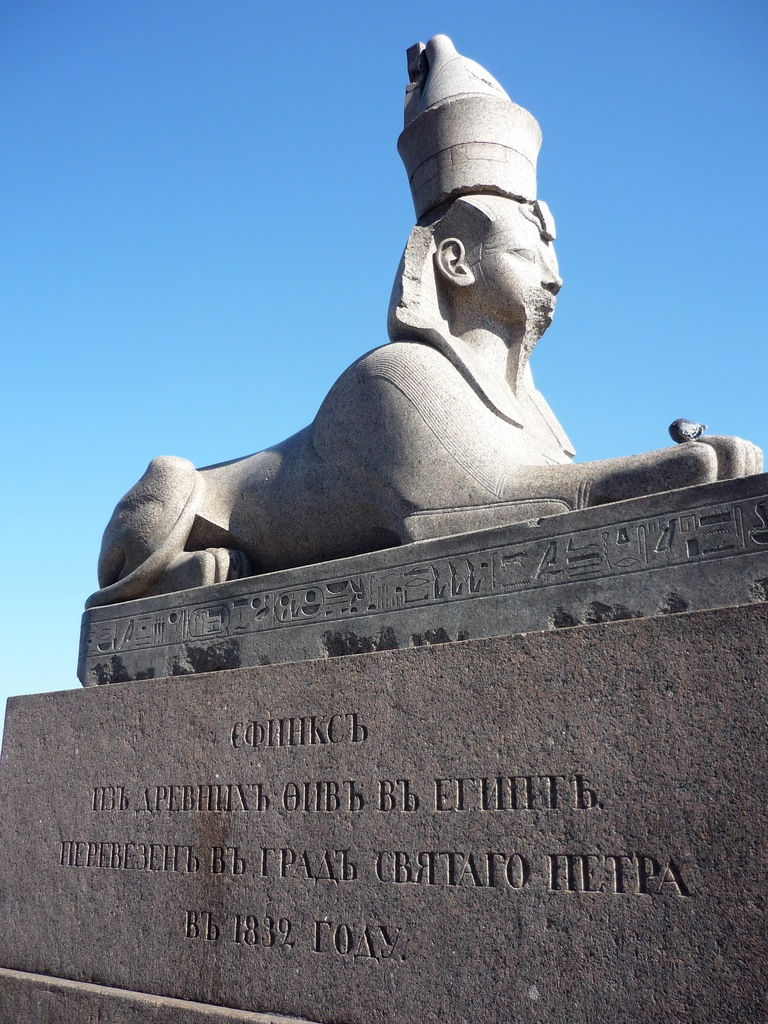

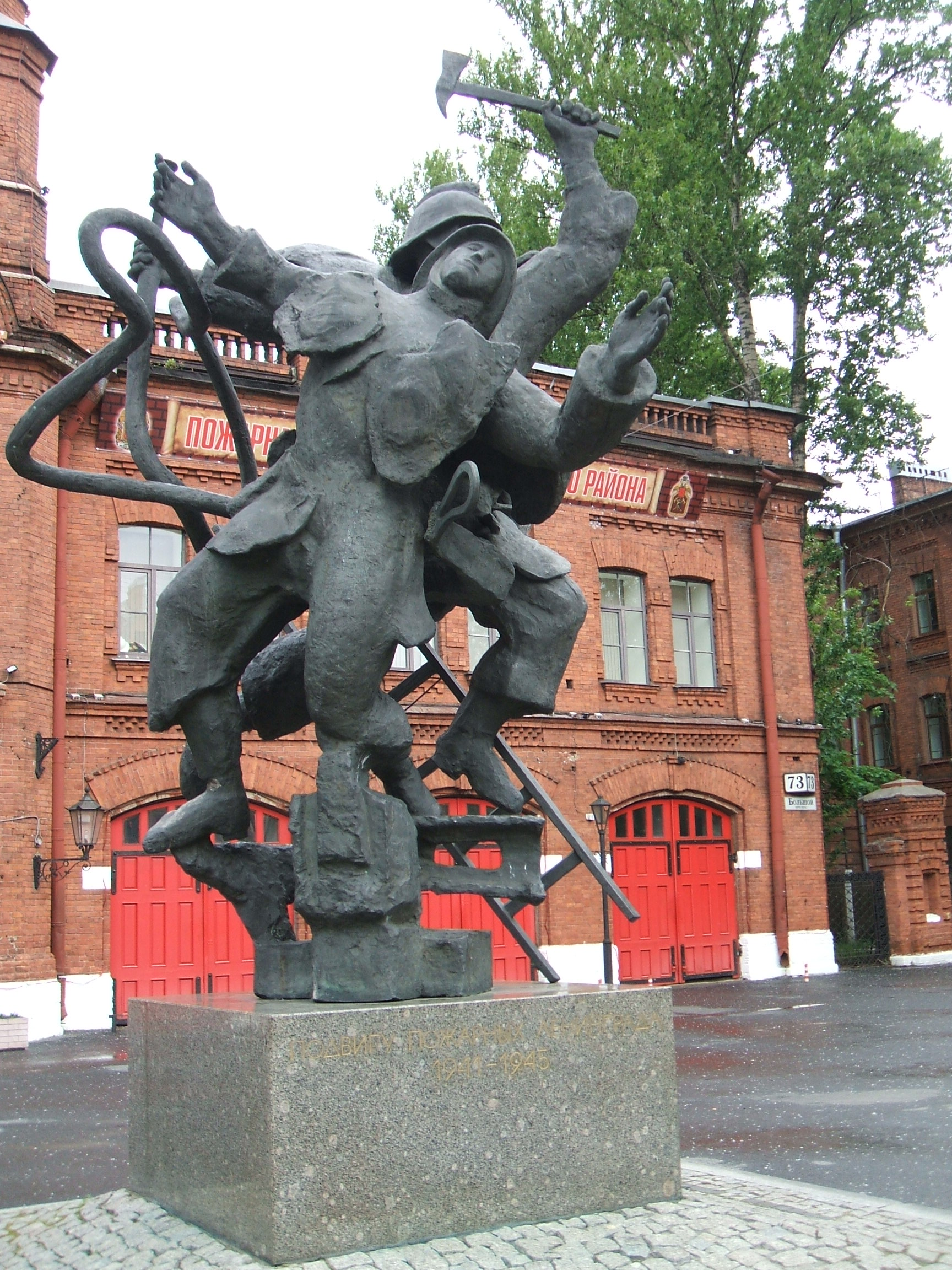

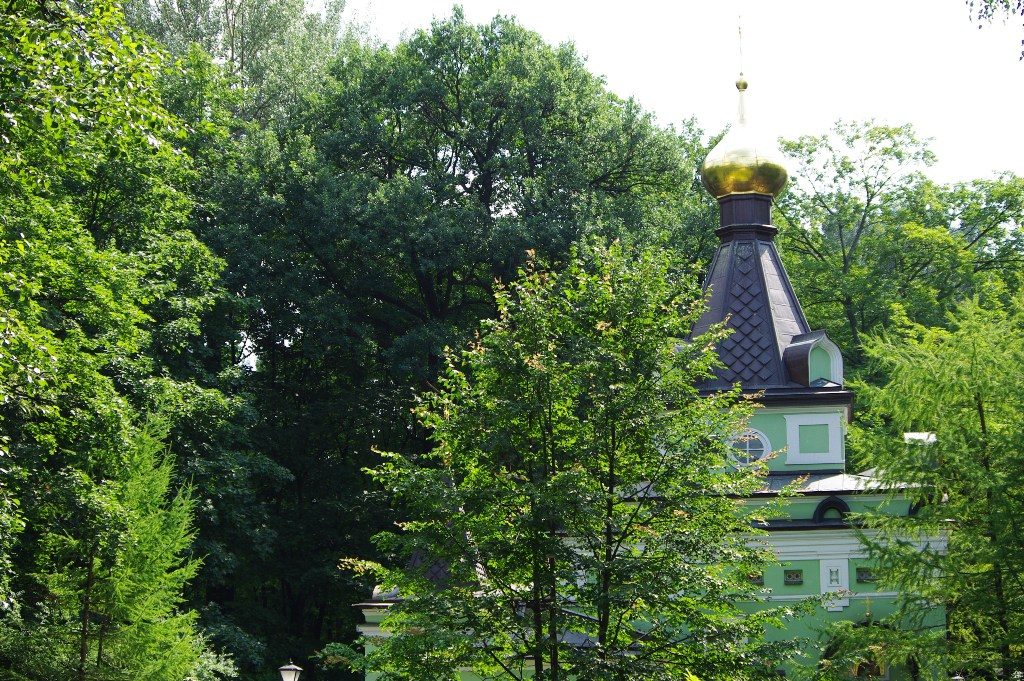

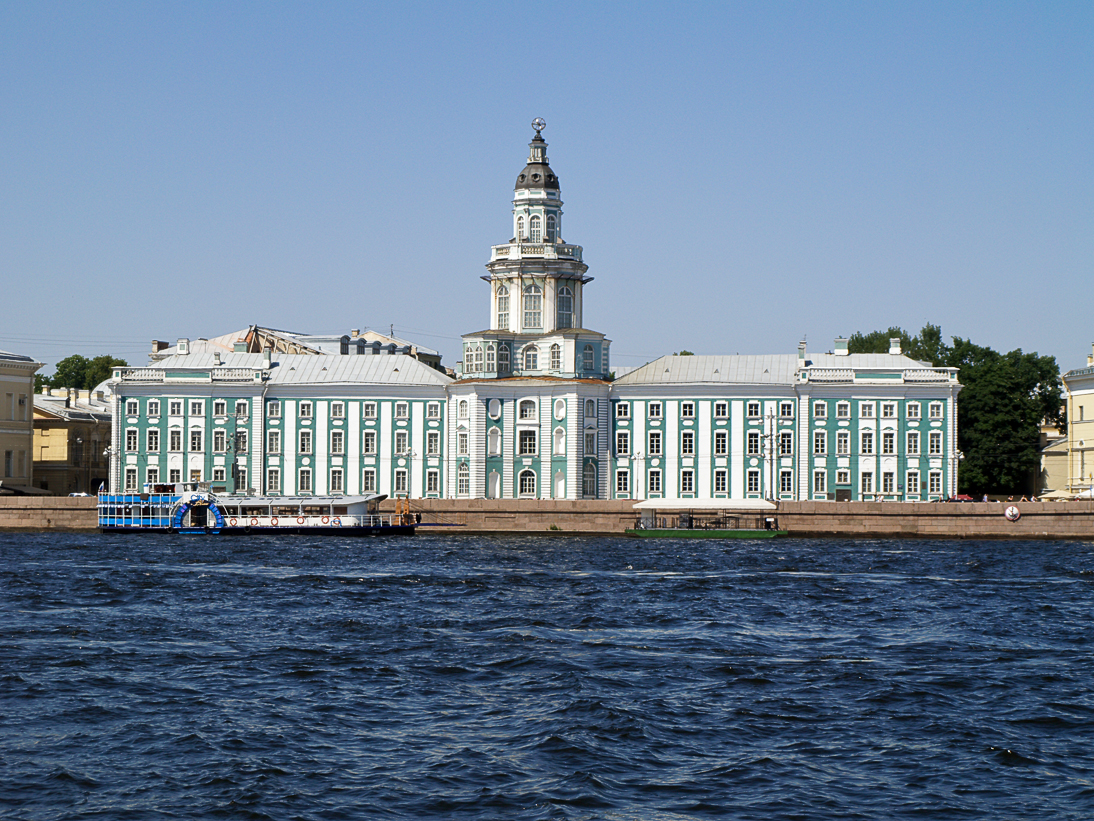

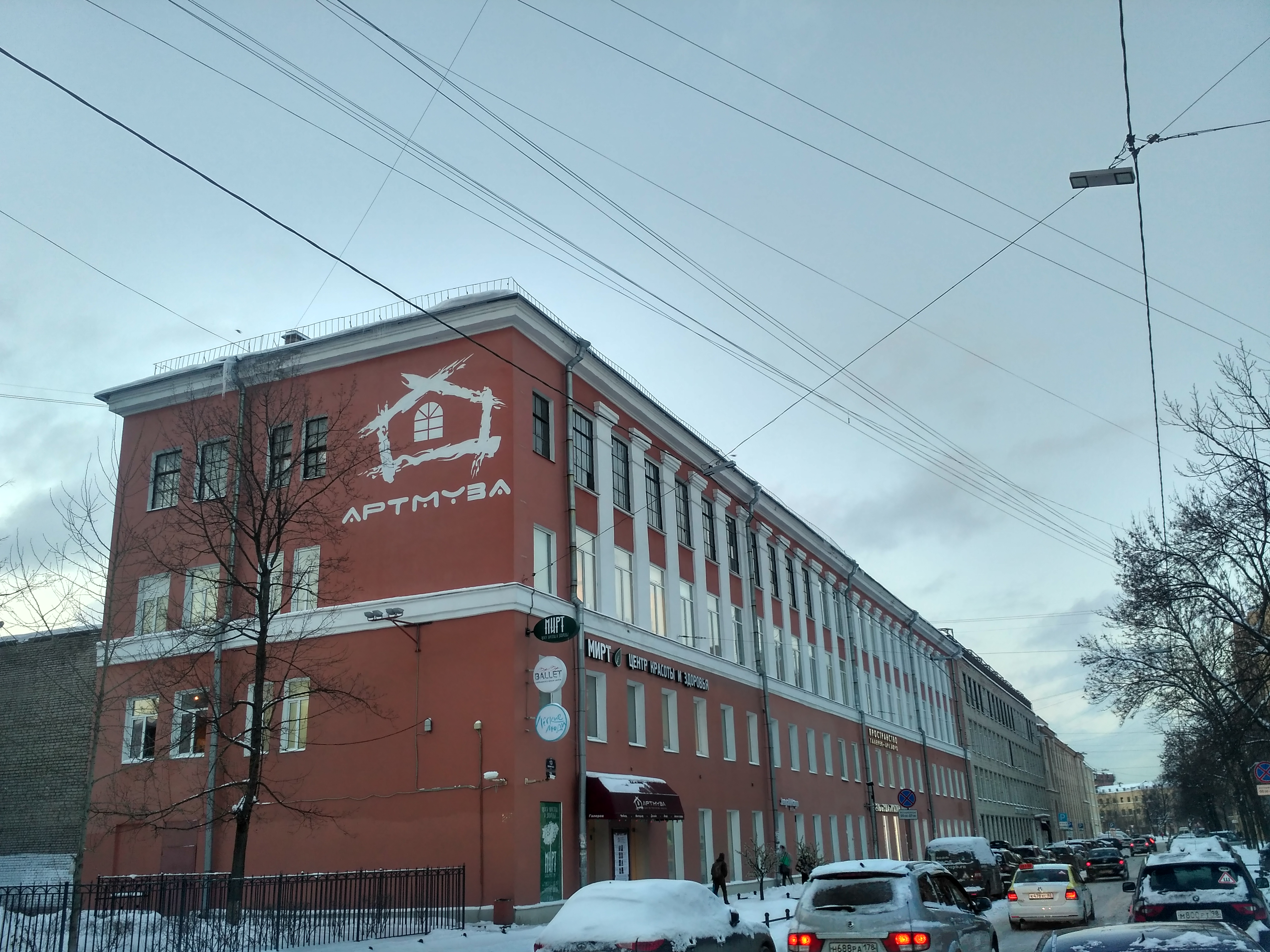
