= Saint Andrew's Cathedral (Saint Petersburg) =

Cathedral in Saint Petersburg, Russia

Coordinates: 59.939818°N 30.283376°E

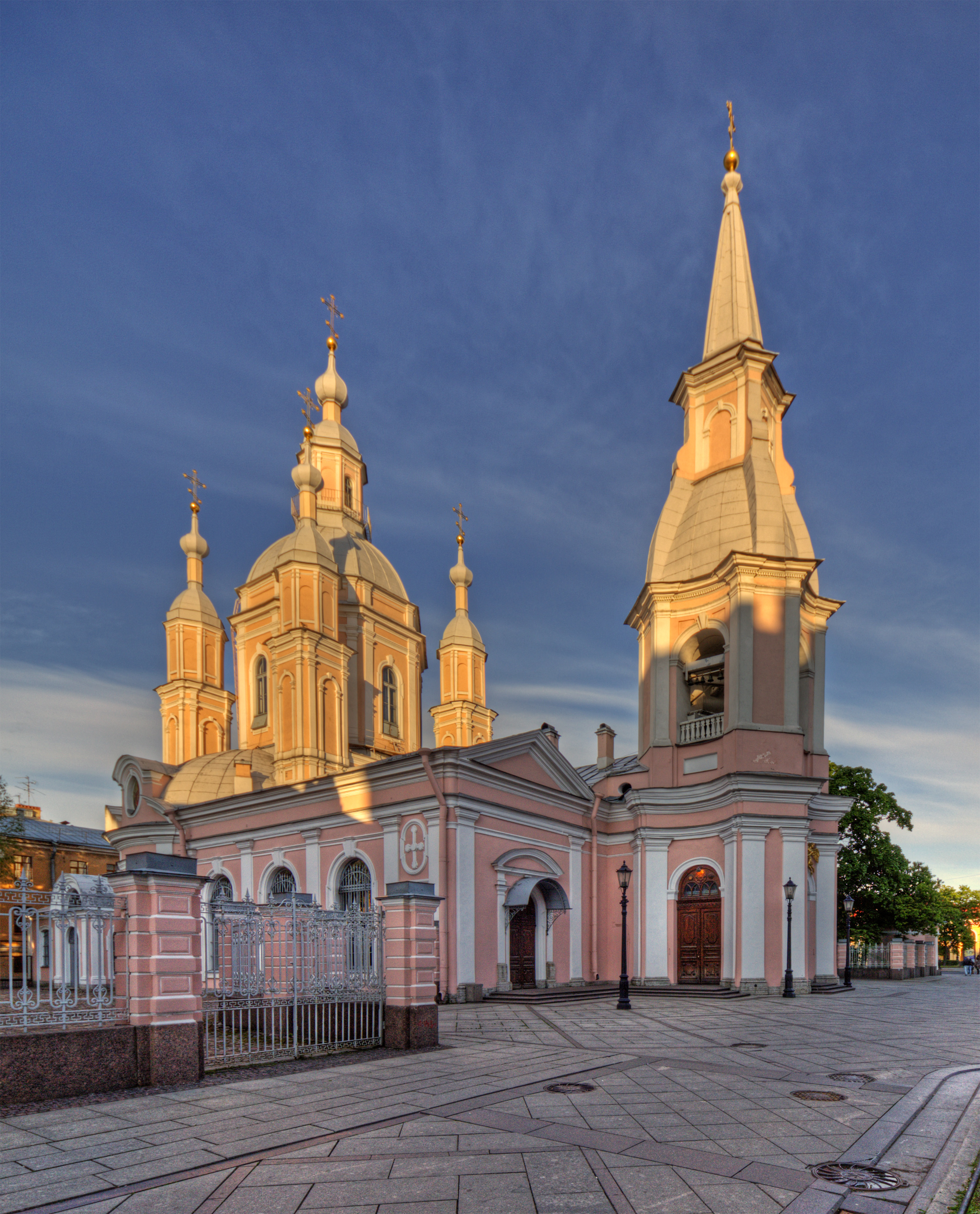
St. Andrew's Cathedral on Vasilievsky Island

Saint Andrew's Cathedral (Russian: Андреевский собор) was the last Baroque cathedral built in Saint Petersburg, Russia.

The cathedral was conceived at the time of Peter the Great as the chapter church of Russia's first chivalric order, that of Saint Andrew. The most famous architect of the Nordic countries, Nicodemus Tessin the Younger, was called upon to design a church resembling St Paul's Cathedral in London and exceeding 430 feet in length.

By the time Tessin submitted his designs, the tsar had died and the costly project was suspended. Two years later, Giuseppe Trezzini, a city architect to St. Petersburg, had the territory behind the building of the Twelve Colleges cleared from wood and built a modest timber church, which was consecrated by Feofan Prokopovich in the name of Saint Andrew on 8 October 1732. It was an austerely rational structure with few stylistic pretensions. Empress Anna donated furnishings to the church, while the icon screen required by Orthodox usage was taken from a chapel of the neighbouring Menshikov Palace.

As the timber church was found too small to house its increasing congregation, Trezzini designed a stone church, which was founded on 2 July 1740 in the proximity of the timber cathedral. The shell of the church was erected within five years, but decoration works prevented its consecration until 1760. It was here that Mikhail Lomonosov and Vasily Trediakovsky were sworn in as professors of the Imperial Academy of Sciences on 30 July 1745. The structure, dedicated in the name of Three Holy Men, still stands.

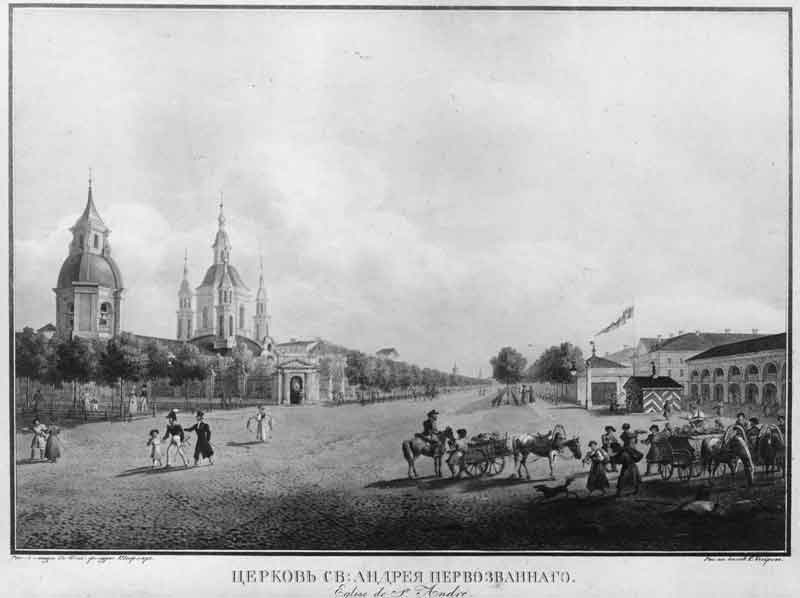
View of the cathedral at the turn of the 19th century.

On 4 July 1761 the wooden cathedral was struck by lightning and burnt to the ground. The architect Alexander Whist (1722–94) was charged with the task of designing a new cathedral of stone. Though founded on 18 July 1764, the church took 22 years to complete. A delay was due to the collapse of its cupola on 6 August 1766, a disaster which led to the architect being taken into custody. It was not until 21 March 1780 that the five-domed pastel pink cathedral was consecrated.

The decoration of the cathedral is restrained (picture), although Emperor Paul, in reasserting its importance as the chapter church of the oldest Russian order of knighthood, had the entrance decorated with a relief representing the order carried by two angels. A special place was reserved in the cathedral for the tsar until 1813.

The pyramidal bell-tower, attached to the church by a refectory, was built in two tiers in 1784-86 and formerly boasted ten bells, the largest of which weighed in excess of four tons. The top of the belfry was remodeled in 1850. Seven years later, the cathedral interior was renovated and the 18th-century icon screen augmented. Furthermore, when the first permanent bridge across the Neva was built in the 1850s, a chapel on the bridge became affiliated with the cathedral.

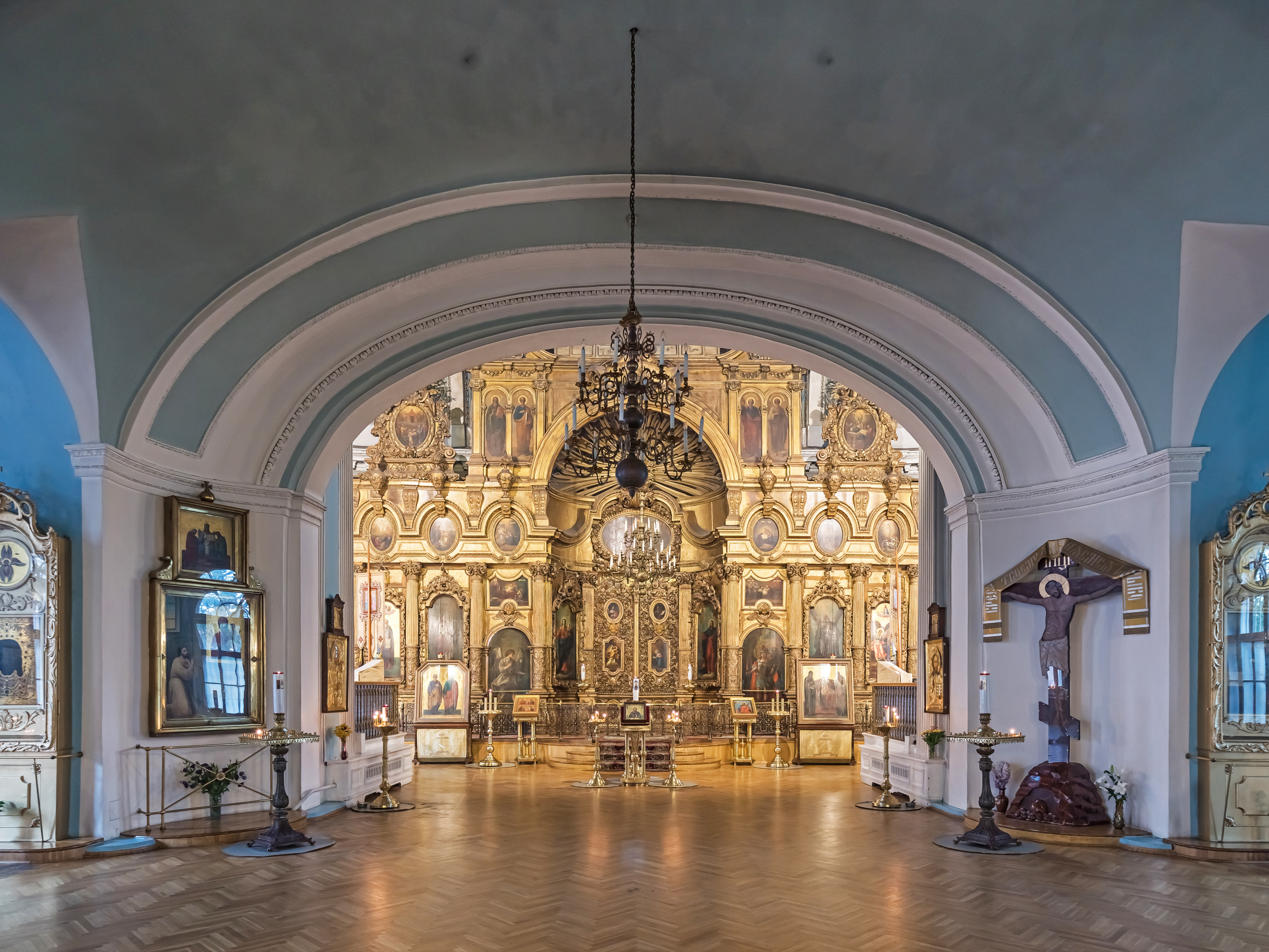
Interior of St. Andrew's Cathedral

After the Russian Revolution of 1917, the Bolsheviks confiscated many valuables from the church. On 24 April 1924 a crowd of several hundred worshipers attempted to defend the icons and clashed with the members of the "expropriation committee". As a consequence of the disorders, the cathedral was given over to the renovationists, a state-sponsored sect which sought to reconcile the ideals of Christianity and Communism.

On 16 May 1938 the cathedral was closed down, its priests arrested and the bells destroyed. However, the impressive baroque iconostasis was restored, while a 17th-century icon with the portraits of Patriarch Nikon and Tsar Alexis was taken to the Russian Museum. During the Siege of Leningrad, the dome was equipped with cannons which helped protect the area from intensive bombing.

In 1992 the cathedral of St. Andrew and the church of Three Holy Men were returned to the Russian Orthodox Church. In 2001, an obelisk was unveiled in front of the church to commemorate the tercentenary of the restored Order of St. Andrew.
