= LVS =

LVS may refer to:

- Latvian National Standardization Institution Latvijas standarts
- Layout Versus Schematic electronic circuit verification
- Linux Virtual Server, load balancing software
- Light Value Scale in photography
- LVS Ascot, Licensed Victuallers' School, Berkshire, UK
- Logistics Vehicle System, USMC tactical vehicles
- LVS-86, a Russian tram
- LVS-97, a Russian tram
- LVS may be one of the following codes:
  - the NYSE ticker for Las Vegas Sands
  - the IATA and FAA code for Las Vegas Municipal Airport
- Las Vegas Strip
