= Trams in Arkhangelsk =

Closed tramway system in Arkhangelsk, Russia

Arkhangelsk tramway network before closure Legend: tramway routes

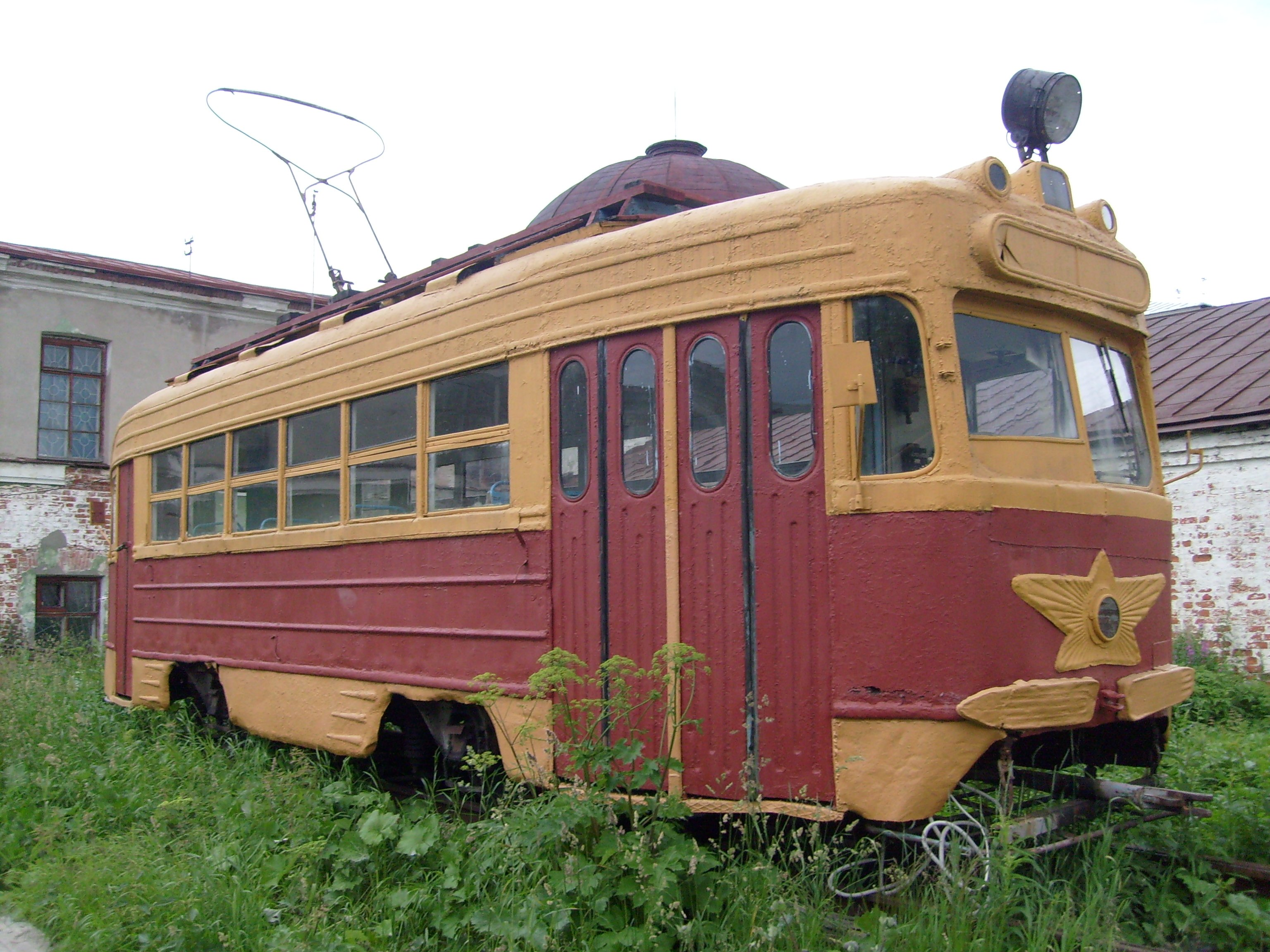
KTM-1 no 8

A tramway system operated in the Russian city of Arkhangelsk from 1916 to 2004, when the last line closed down. During that period it was the most northerly such system in the world: before 1916 that distinction had been held by the city trams in Kiruna, Sweden; since 2004 the honour has belonged to the Trondheim Tramway in Norway.

== History ==
Work on the first tramway line started in 1914 and it was opened on 26 June 1916. Until 1956 Arkhangelsk had two separate tramway networks – one running on the mainland and the other on the island of Solombala as there was no bridge to carry the trams over the Kuznechikha river. At certain times during the winter, tracks were laid directly on the ice (a similar method was used in St Petersburg during some winters). The opening of the Kuznechevskiy Bridge in 1956 made it possible to connect the two networks permanently.

With the demise of the Soviet Union, public transport services declined in many Russian cities. In Arkhangelsk, the Solombala network was shut down in 2000, the official reason being the bad condition of the Kuznechevskiy Bridge. Two years later there were severe cuts to the tramway lines on the mainland. The last tram returned to the depot on 21 July 2004. After this the tramway tracks were removed from the main streets.

== Stock ==
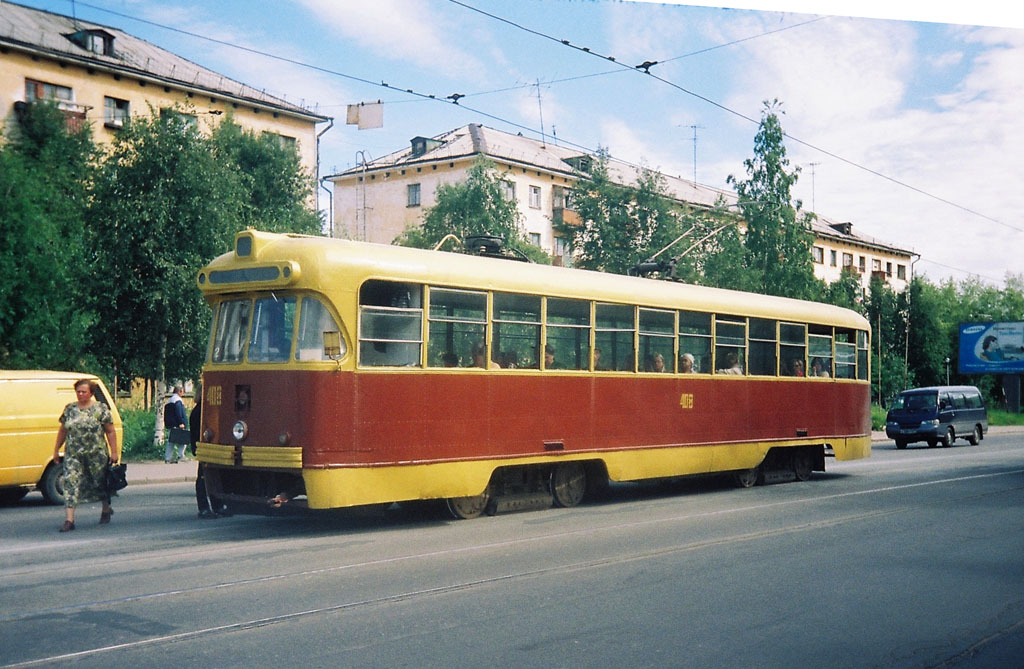
RVZ-6 tram

In the last years that the Arkhangelsk tramway operated the following trams were used:

- LM-93 – 20 four-axle trams, manufactured between 1993 and 1999 by the Petersburg Tram Mechanical Factory
- RVZ-6 - one tram

Before 2002 six LVS-86T trams were also used. One KTM-1 tram was saved from being scrapped and preserved as a monument.

== Sources ==
- History of trams in Arkhangelsk
- transphoto.ru
