= LM-33 =

Soviet tram produced in the 1930s

LM-33 "Americana"
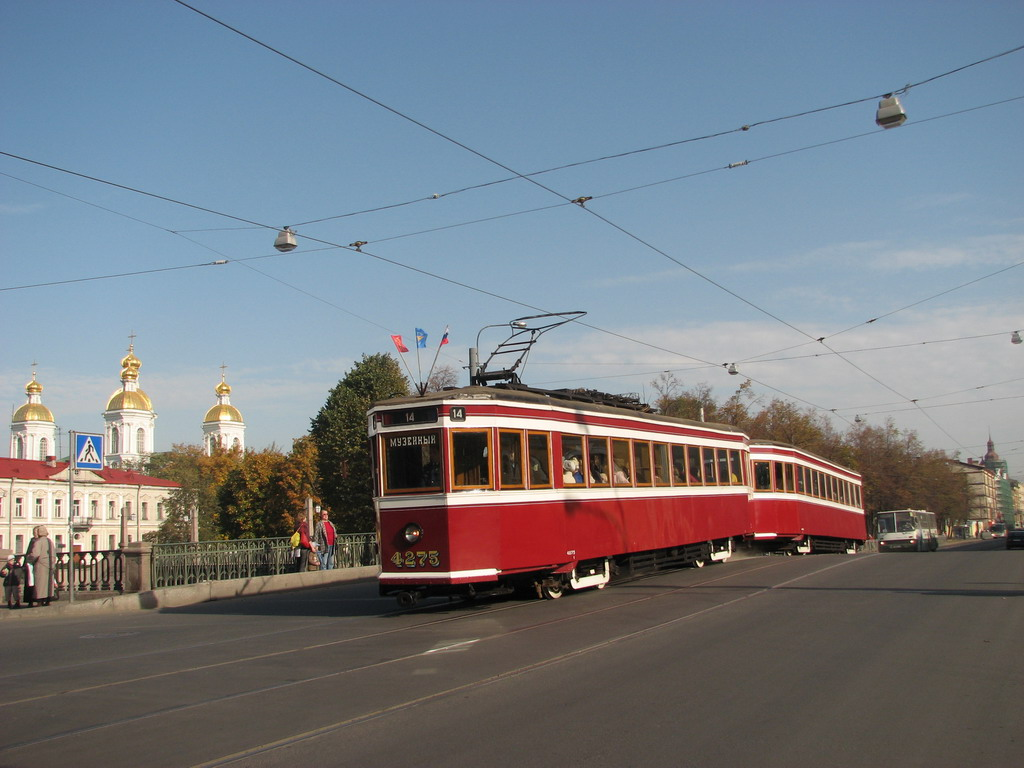
- LM-33 and LP-33 tram and trailer crossing the Staro-Nikolsky bridge in Saint Petersburg
- Manufacturer: Petersburg Tram Mechanical Factory
- Designer: D.I. Kondratiev
- Constructed: 1933–1939
- Entered service: 1933–18 March 1979
- Number built: 232
- Number preserved: 3 (2 × LM-33; 1 × LP-44)
- Capacity: 178 (49 seated, 129 standing)

Specifications
- Car length: 15,000 mm (49 ft 3 in)
- Width: 2,600 mm (8 ft 6 in)
- Height: 3,318 mm (10 ft 10.6 in)
- Wheelbase: 7,500 mm (24 ft 7 in) (between bolsters); 1,800 mm (5 ft 11 in) (between axles)
- Maximum speed: 50 km/h (31 mph)
- Weight: 22.2 t (24.5 tons)
- Traction motors: 4 × PT-35 or 4 × DTI-60
- Power output: 40 kW (54 hp) (PT-35) or 55 kW (74 hp) (DTI-60)
- Power supply: DC-7B controller
- Wheels driven: 8
- Bogies: 2
- Braking system(s): Pneumatic direct motion and hand-wheeled motorized shoe
- Track gauge: 1,524 mm (5 ft)

The LM-33 is a four-axle Soviet tram, produced by the Petersburg Tram Mechanical Factory (PTMF) from 1933 to 1939.

== History ==
In the early 1930s, D.I. Kondratiev and a group of Leningrad specialists visited America to learn about local developments. A new model of the Leningrad tram was derived from this research trip based on the Peter Witt design. The design was modified in accordance with Soviet domestic requirements; in particular, the width of the wagon was reduced. The first tram of this design was produced by PTMF. It was originally named MA (Mоторный Aмериканского типа), and its unpowered trailer was named PA (rus. ПА, Прицепной Aмериканского типa). The model quickly earned the nickname "American". Later for political reasons, the wagon names were changed to LM-33 (Leningradsky Motorny projekta 1933 goda) and LP-33 (Leningradsky Pritsepnoy projekta 1933 goda), respectively.

LM-33 and LP-33 were built between 1933 and 1939.

== Operation ==
LM-33/LP-33 trains were operated in Leningrad from 1933 until March 18, 1979.

== Preservation ==
Two copies of LM-33 have survived in the electric transportation museum in Saint Petersburg: motor 4275 (undergoing restoration) and the loading platform at the LM-33 No. 4435 (awaiting restoration). An LP-33 trailer (number 4454) is also being restored.

== See also ==
- Trams in Saint Petersburg
