= Peter Witt streetcar =

North American streetcar

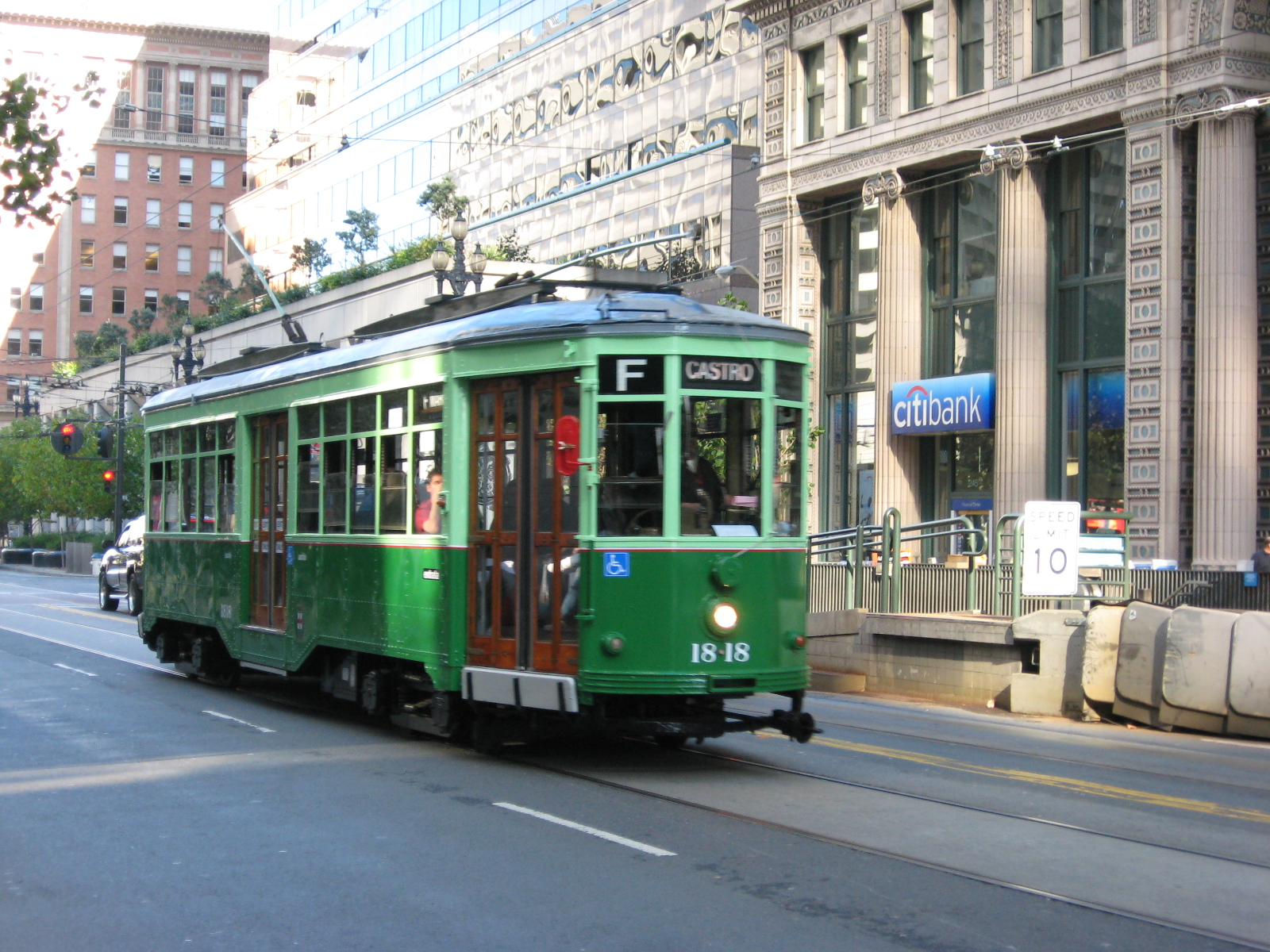
- This ex-Milan car, now operating in San Francisco, carries the two-tone green color scheme used by Milan from 1926 to the 1970s.

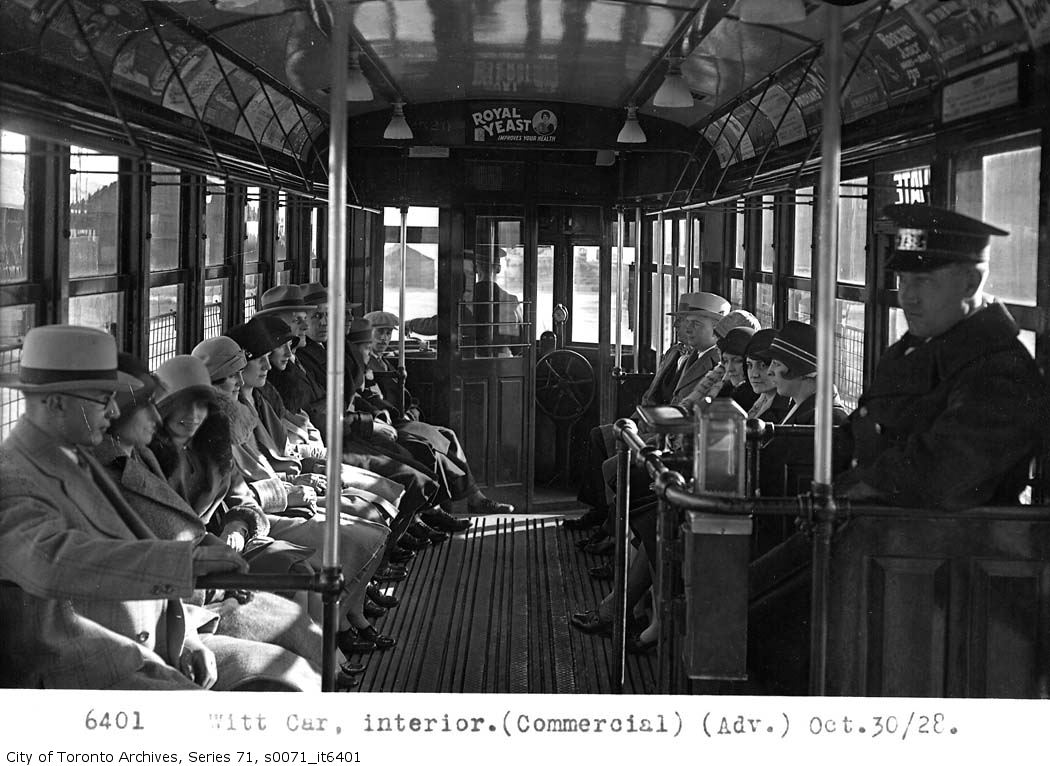
- Interior of a Toronto Transportation Commission Peter Witt streetcar on October 30, 1928. Note the second crew member, sitting by the fare box, waiting to collect fares from passengers.
- Designer: Peter Witt

Specifications
- UIC classification: Bo'Bo'
- AAR wheel arrangement: B-B
- Bogies: 2

The Peter Witt streetcar was introduced by Cleveland Railway commissioner Peter Witt (1869–1948) who led the transit agency from 1911 to 1915 and designed a model of streetcar known by his name that was used in many North American cities, most notably in Toronto, Buffalo, and Cleveland.

== Features ==
This design was distinguished from other streetcars of the era by its use of the center door as an exit only, with a conductor stationed inside just in front of the door. Passengers could board through the front doors without waiting or paying; they could pay the conductor immediately and sit in the rear of the car (in the nicer seats), or wait in front and pay just before they exited. This had the effect of reducing the car's dwell time at stops, improving schedule times and increasing capacity. Many vehicles were later converted to pay-as-you-enter operation in order to reduce the number of staff needed, but they continued to be known as Peter Witt cars.

== History ==
Witt completed the first prototype in 1914 and filed his patent for the car design in 1915. G.C. Kuhlman Car Company then delivered 130 cars of this design to Cleveland in 1915 and 1916. From this point the design was licensed to a number of cities that needed large capacity trolleys. Toronto Transportation Commission ordered 575 custom Peter Witt cars from 1921 to 1923 and operated them until 1965. Philadelphia Rapid Transit ordered 525 cars from 1923 to 1926, while also converting most of their 1,500 Nearside streetcar fleet to center exit models. Production continued until the introduction of the PCC streetcar in the mid-1930s.

Peter Witt cars were also built in Italy and used in several Italian cities, including Milan, where circa 135 out of 502 originally built class 1500 cars (introduced in 1928) are still in regular service in 2021. Additionally eleven ex-Milan cars can be seen today on the streets of San Francisco, where they operate on the F Market & Wharves streetcar line. Also in Italy, 30 heavily rebuilt Peter Witt cars are still in use in Naples. Neapolitan prototype cars 901 and 902, built in 1930, and the first series order cars 903–906, built in 1932, were the only Peter Witt cars in use by 1950; they were rebuilt, eliminating the center door and adding a rear door to match the rest of the fleet built from 1932 on. The present rebuilt fleet has some of these cars, though they are no longer in Peter Witt format.

In early 1930s, а group of Soviet engineers from Leningrad headed by designer D. I. Kondratyev visited the United States and, on their return, adapted the American design to the local narrower loading gauge to start local production of the model LM-33 (popularly known as "американка" (Amerikanka, Russian for "an American lady") that was later used in the city for 45 years (in its last decades, together with other tram models), until mid-March 1979, according to St.Petersburg Museum of the City's Electric Transport.

Besides their continued use in day-to-day service in Milan, San Francisco and (in a rebuilt form) Naples, Peter Witt cars have been preserved in several locations. Gomaco Trolley Company, a US streetcar renovation specialist, has bought 70 ex-Milan cars which it is offering to museums and heritage streetcar operators. A St. Petersburg, Russia, museum has a restored sample of the version once made and used in the city.

=== Operators ===
Operators that used Peter Witt streetcars included:

Operator	City	State/province	Country
Azienda Tranvie Municipali (now Gruppo Torinese Trasporti)	Turin	Turin	Italy
Azienda Napoletana Mobilità	Naples	Naples	Italy
Azienda Trasporti Milanesi	Milan	Milan	Italy
Baltimore Transit Company	Baltimore	Maryland	United States
Brooklyn & Queens Transit	New York	New York	United States
Chicago Surface Lines	Chicago	Illinois	United States
Cleveland Railway	Cleveland	Ohio	United States
Dallas Railway & Terminal Co.	Dallas	Texas	United States
Department of Street Railways	Detroit	Michigan	United States
Empresa Municipal de Transportes	Madrid	Madrid	Spain
International Railway Co.	Buffalo	New York	United States
Kitchener & Waterloo Street Railway	Kitchener and Waterloo	Ontario	Canada
Leningrad	Leningrad	Russian SFSR	Soviet Union
London Street Railway	London	Ontario	Canada
Los Angeles Railway	Los Angeles	California	United States
Louisville Railway	Louisville	Kentucky	United States
Melbourne & Metropolitan Tramways Board	Melbourne	Victoria	Australia
New York State Railways	Rochester & Syracuse	New York	United States
Ottawa Transportation Commission	Ottawa	Ontario	Canada
Philadelphia Rapid Transit & Philadelphia Transportation Company	Philadelphia	Pennsylvania	United States
Porto Rico Railway, Light & Power Co	San Juan		Puerto Rico
Rochester Industrial & Rapid Transit Railway	Rochester	New York	United States
San Francisco Municipal Railway	San Francisco	California	United States
Saskatoon Municipal Railway	Saskatoon	Saskatchewan	Canada
Servicio de Transportes Eléctricos	Mexico City	Distrito Federal	Mexico
St. Louis Public Service Company	St. Louis	Missouri	United States
Toronto Transportation Commission / Toronto Transit Commission	Toronto	Ontario	Canada
United Railways & Electric Company	Baltimore	Maryland	United States

=== Builders ===
Company	City	State/province	Country
J. G. Brill Company	Philadelphia	Pennsylvania	United States
Canadian Car and Foundry	Montreal	Quebec	Canada
Carminati & Toselli	Milan	Milan	Italy
Cincinnati Car Company	Cincinnati	Ohio	United States
G. C. Kuhlman Car Company	Cleveland	Ohio	United States
Officine Elettro-Ferroviarie Tallero (OEFT)	Milan	Milan	Italy
Officine Moncenisio	Condove	Turin	Italy
Officine Ferroviarie Meridionali (OFM)	Naples	Naples	Italy
Ottawa Car Company	Ottawa	Ontario	Canada
Petersburg Tram Mechanical Factory (PTMF)	Leningrad	Russian SFSR	Soviet Union
Preston Car Company	Preston	Ontario	Canada
St. Louis Car Company	St. Louis	Missouri	United States

== Gallery ==
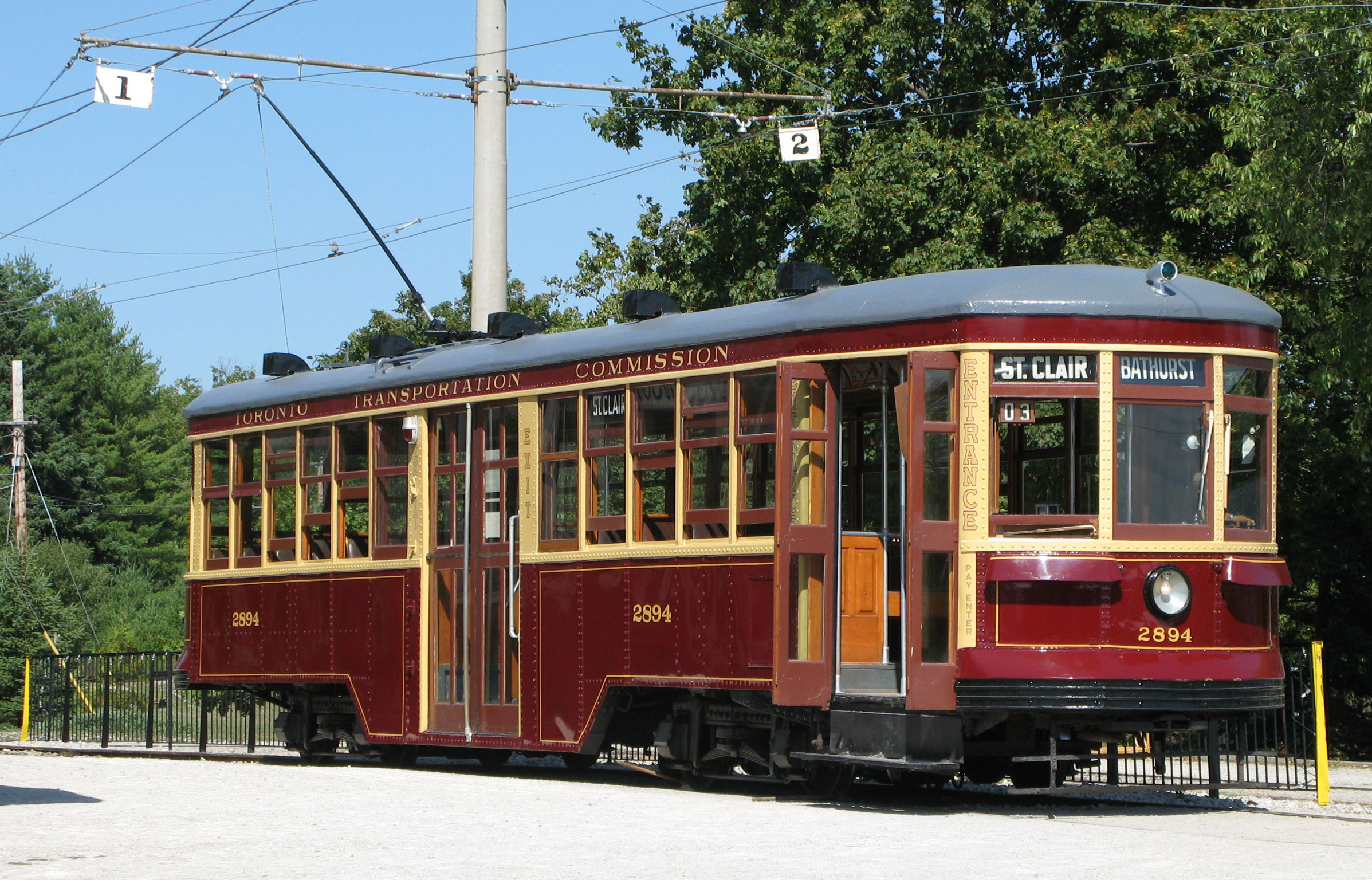
This ex-Toronto car is in its 1921 livery and is located at the Halton County Radial Railway Museum.

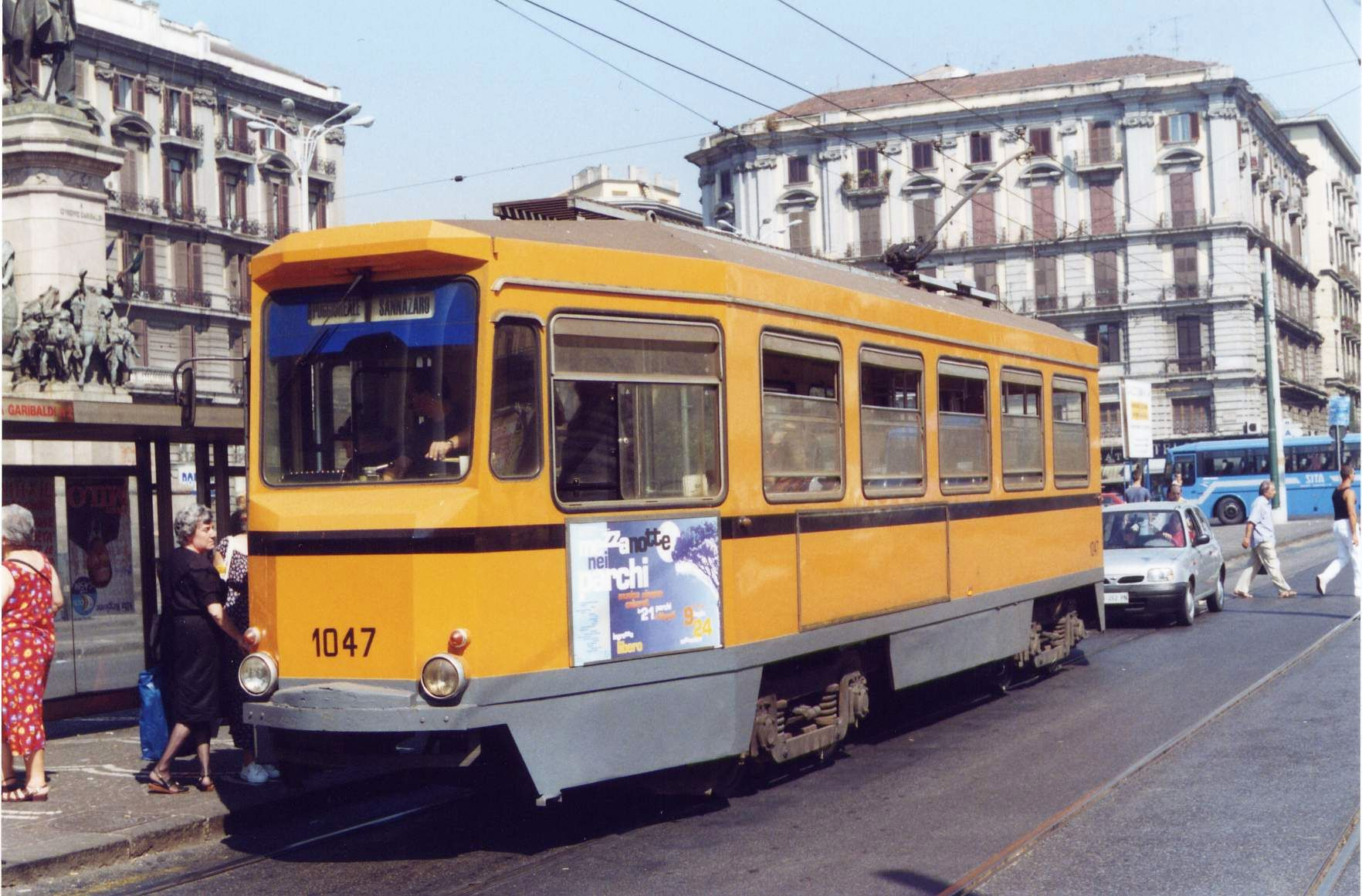
An example of the rebuilt Peter Witt cars used in Naples

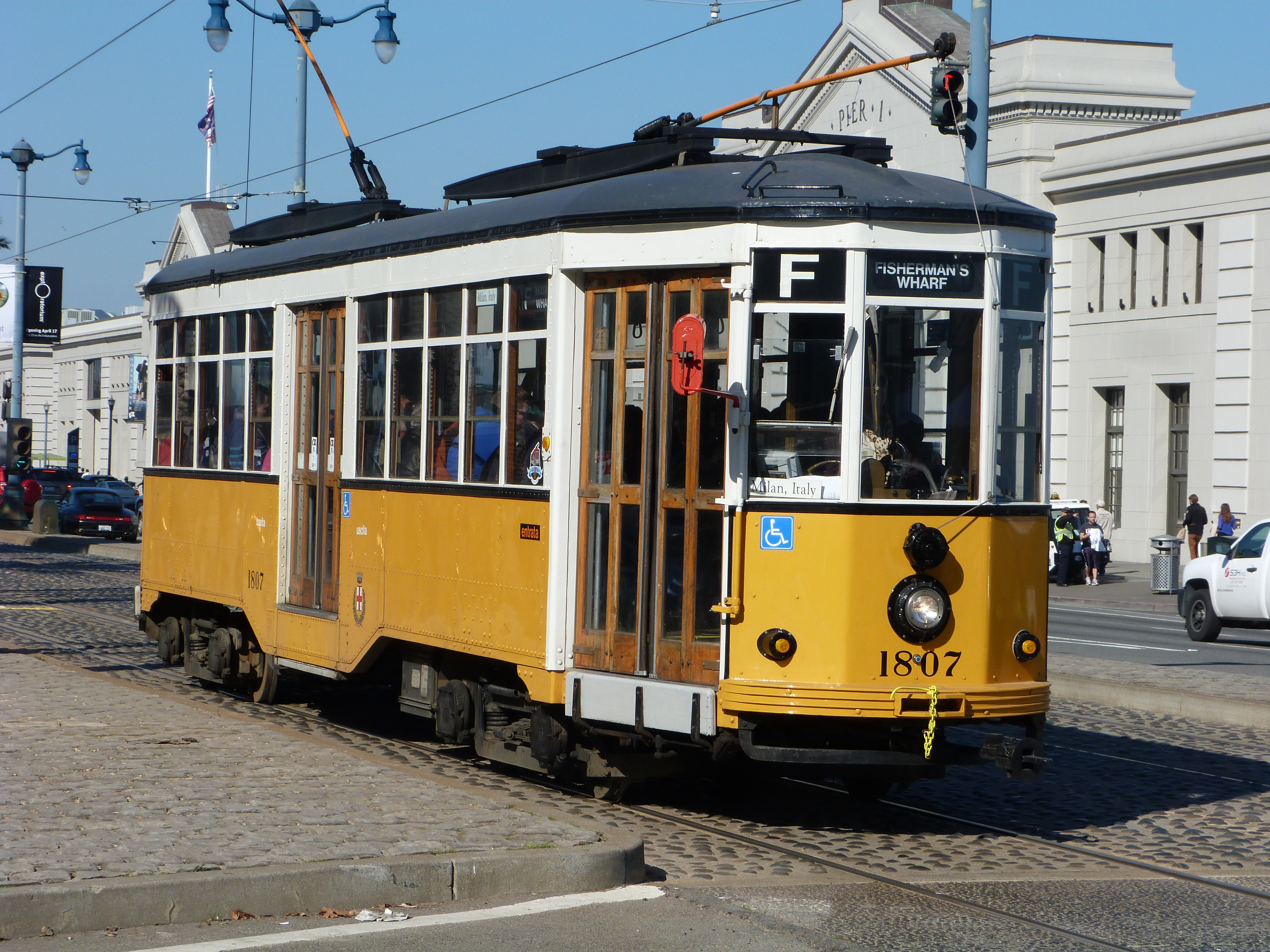
An ex-Milan Peter Witt car Class 1500 operating on the Embarcadero in San Francisco

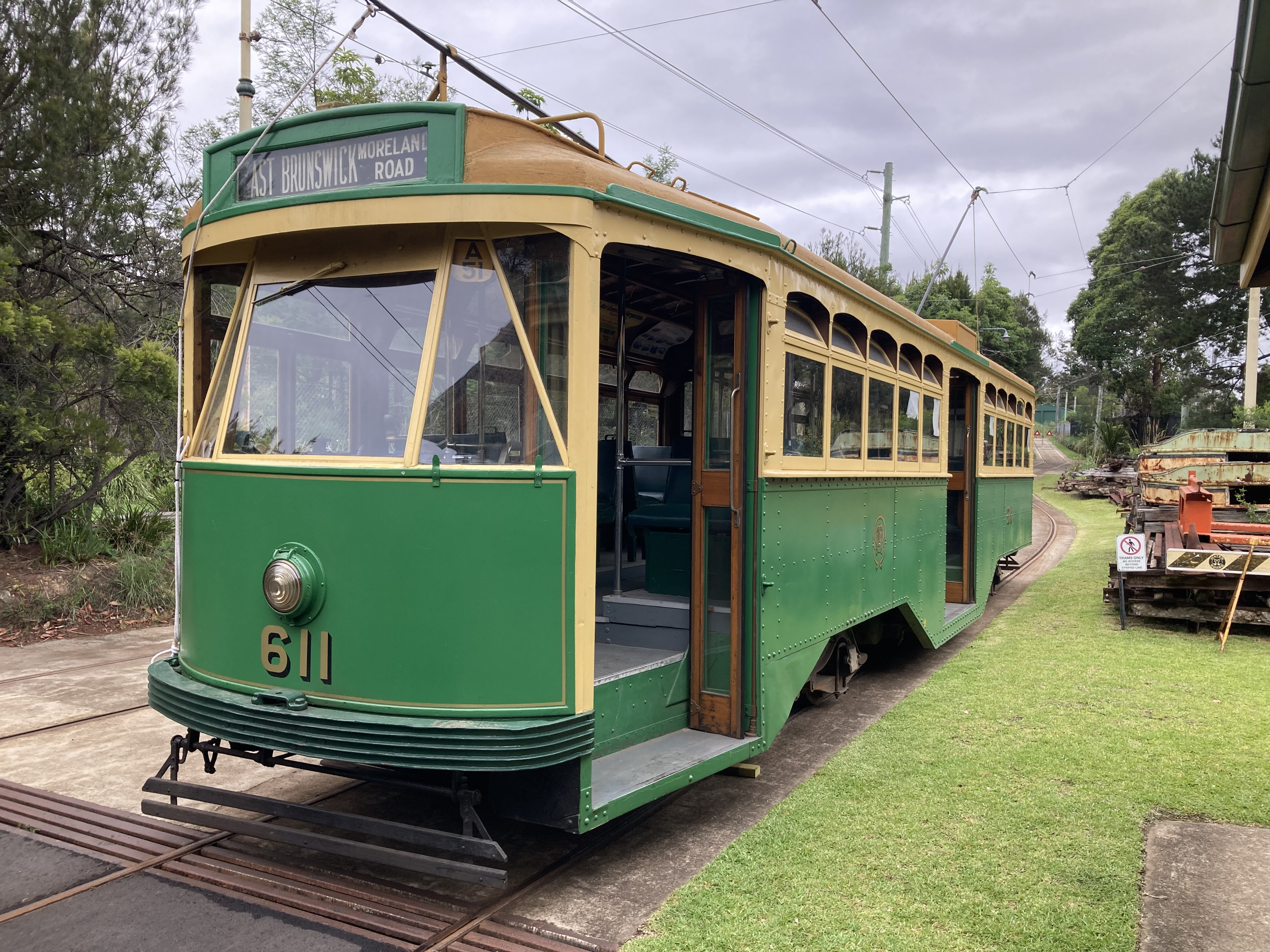
Melbourne, Australia, operated a number of Peter Witt–style trams. Pictured is a 1930s version.

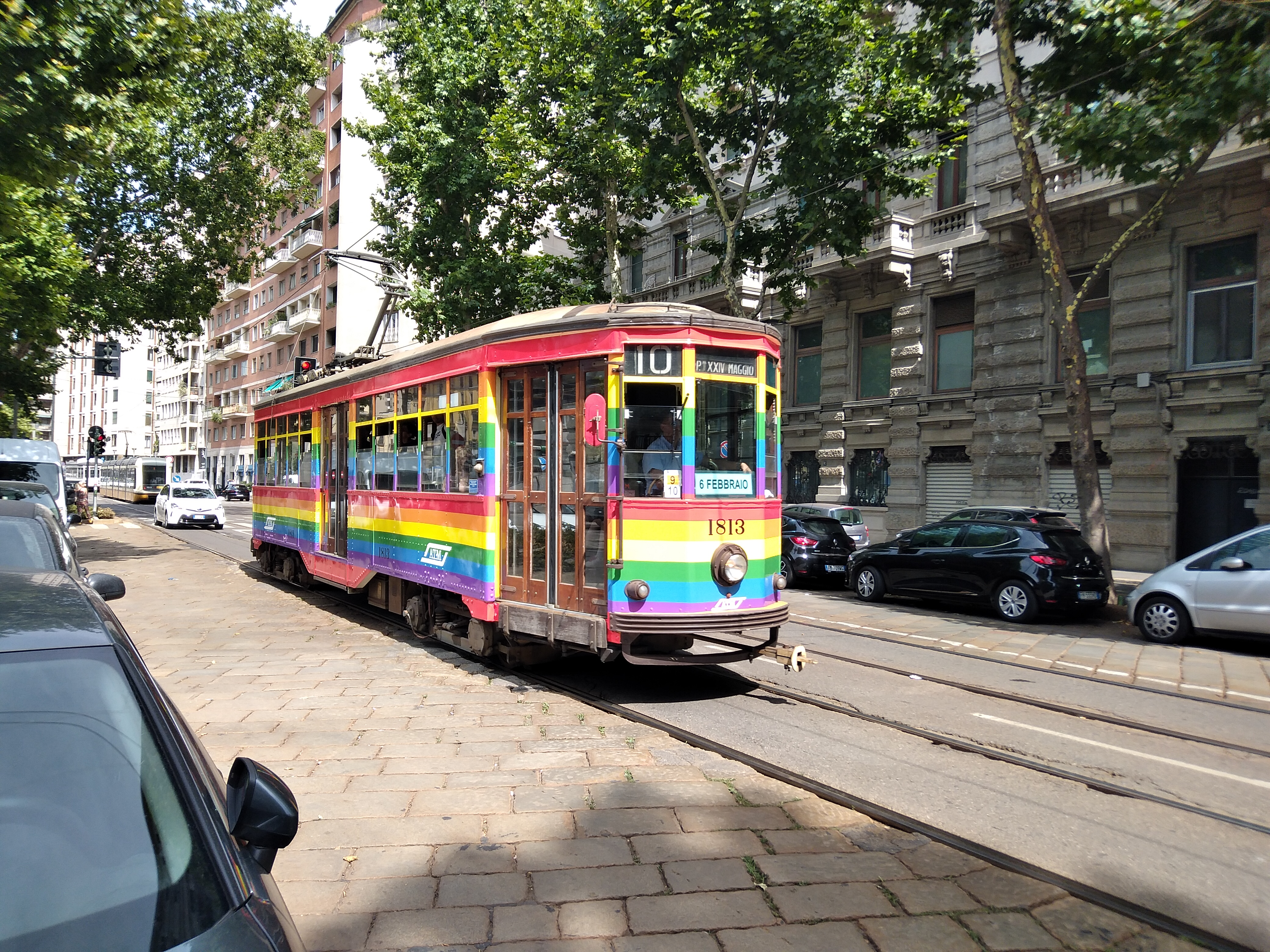
Milan ATM car 1813 in rainbow livery in service in 2022

== See also ==
- Peter Witt (Toronto streetcar)
- LM-33 – Russian version of the Peter Witt
- Birney Safety Car, an alternative contemporary car
- PCC streetcar, successor to the Peter Witt
- Streetcars in Cleveland
