= ATM Class 1500 =

Tram vehicle used in Milan

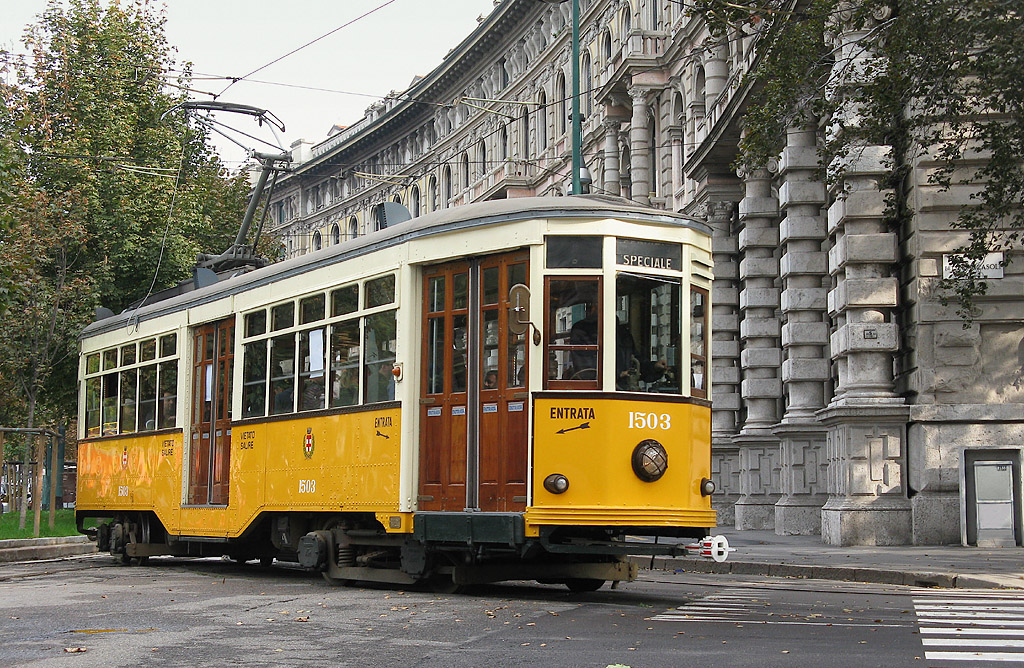
- Car no. 1503, restored, at Piazza Castello
- Manufacturers: Breda, Carminati & Toselli, Lodigiane, OM, Reggiane, Tallero
- Constructed: 1927–1930
- Number built: 502
- Number in service: ca. 135
- Fleet numbers: 1501–2002
- Capacity: 29 (Seated); 101 (Standing)

Specifications
- Train length: 13,890 mm (547 in)
- Low-floor: no
- Wheelbase: 1,625 mm (64.0 in)
- Maximum speed: 42 km/h (26 mph)
- Weight: 14.8 t (33,000 lb)
- Traction motors: TIBB Milano 28, Ansaldo LC 221
- Power output: 84 kW (113 hp)
- Power supply: 600 V DC; Overhead line
- Current collection: Pantograph
- Track gauge: 1,445 mm (4 ft 8 7/8 in)

The ATM Class 1500, also known as type 1928, is a series of tram vehicles used by the ATM on the Milan urban tramway network.

== History ==
In the 1920s, the increasing traffic on the Milan urban tramway network made pressing the substitution of the old tramcars ″type Edison″. The municipal tram office decided to design a new type of tramcars, built on two bogies, taking as model the Peter Witt streetcars built in Cleveland and in other cities of the United States.

The Milan streetcar was projected by the municipal engineers in 1927, and two prototypes, built by Carminati & Toselli and numbered 1501 and 1502, came into service at the end of the same year.

After a few tests, the construction of a 500 units stock (numbered 1503 to 2002) began, divided between several manufacturers:

- the Società Italiana Carminati & Toselli built 110 units (1503 to 1612);
- the Società Italiana Ernesto Breda built 110 units (1613 to 1722);
- the Officine Meccaniche di Reggio Emilia built 50 units (1723 to 1772);
- the Officine Meccaniche built 110 units (1773 to 1882);
- the Officine Elettro-Ferroviarie Tallero built 110 units (1883 to 1992);
- the Officine Meccaniche Lodigiane built 10 units (1993 to 2002).

The electrical equipment were built by Ansaldo and TIBB, the bogies by Fiat under Commonwealth-license.

The cars were delivered in 1929–1930 and immediately put into service. In 1932–1935 some cars were equipped with an experimental half door at the tail, and from 1938 to 1940 with a definitive entire door; the Peter Witt system were therefore abandoned after a few years of service.

During the Second World War many cars were seriously damaged, but only one unit had to be scrapped, the others being repaired or reconstructed from 1945 to 1949.

From 1970 on, the traditional green livery (introduced in 1930) was abandoned, and a new orange one introduced; from 1972 the traditional trolley pole was substituted by a pantograph. Since 1976 some cars were put aside and later demolished.

Nowadays circa 135 units are still in service, repainted in the last years in a white and yellow livery already used on the prototypes. Most trams are in use for daily service, but some are for special occasions (trams 1503, 1699, 1702, 1723, 1794, 1822, 1830 and 1847), some for drivers instructions (trams 1602, 1798, 1862), two for the driving restaurant service ATMosfera (trams 1855 and 1970) and there is the ″white tram″, the school tram (″Scuolaintram″).

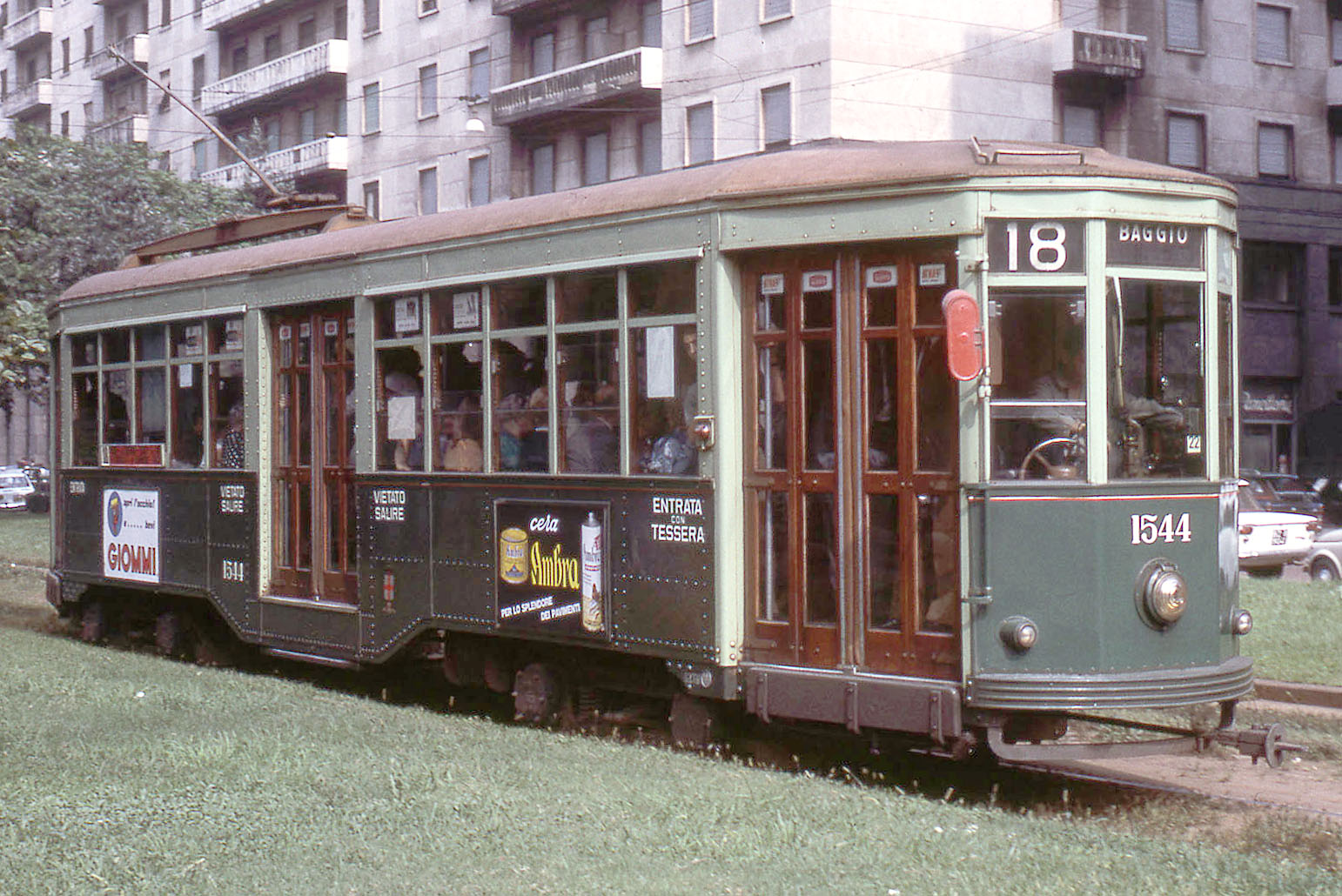
No. 1544 in green livery

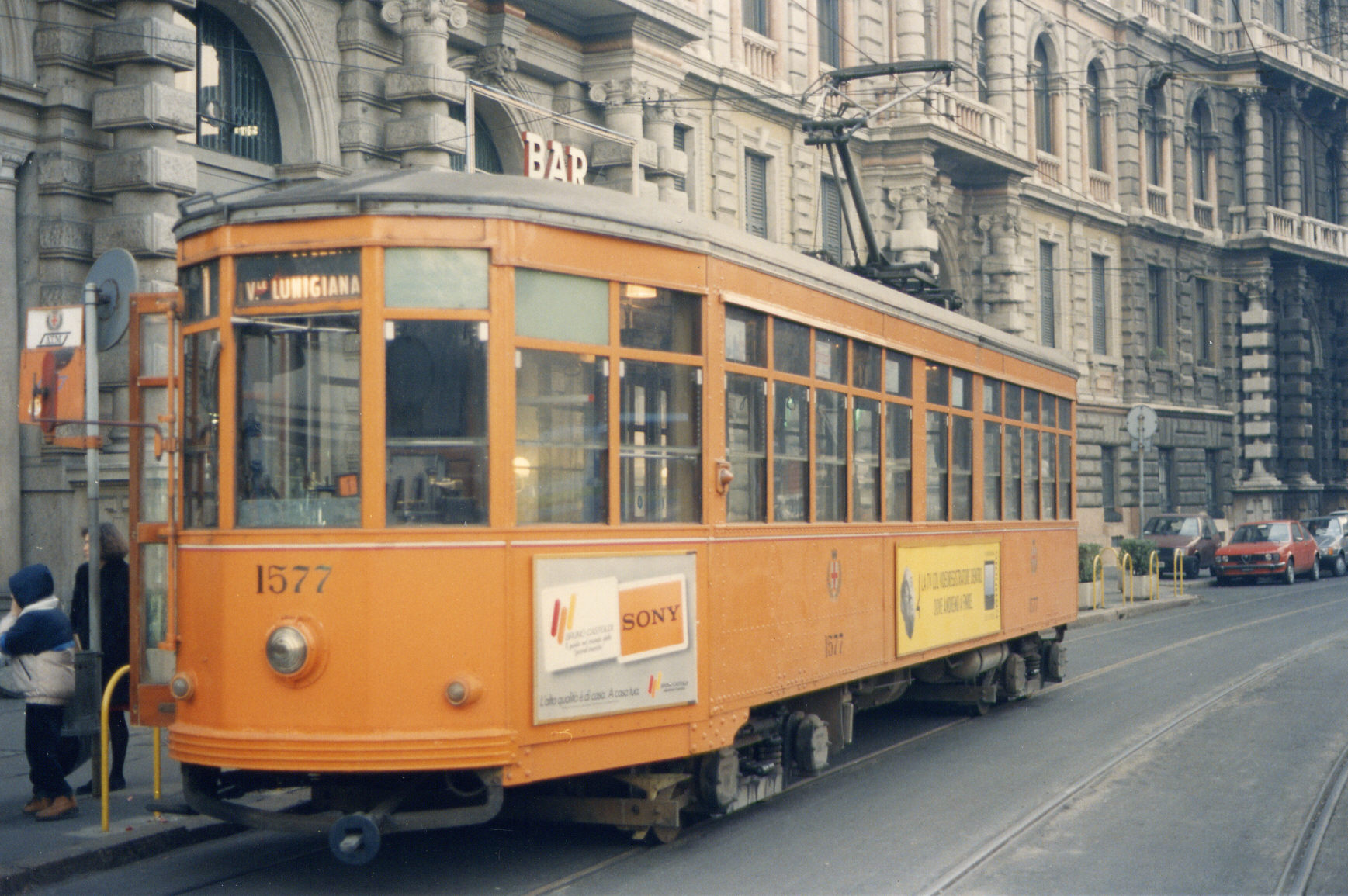
No. 1577 in orange livery

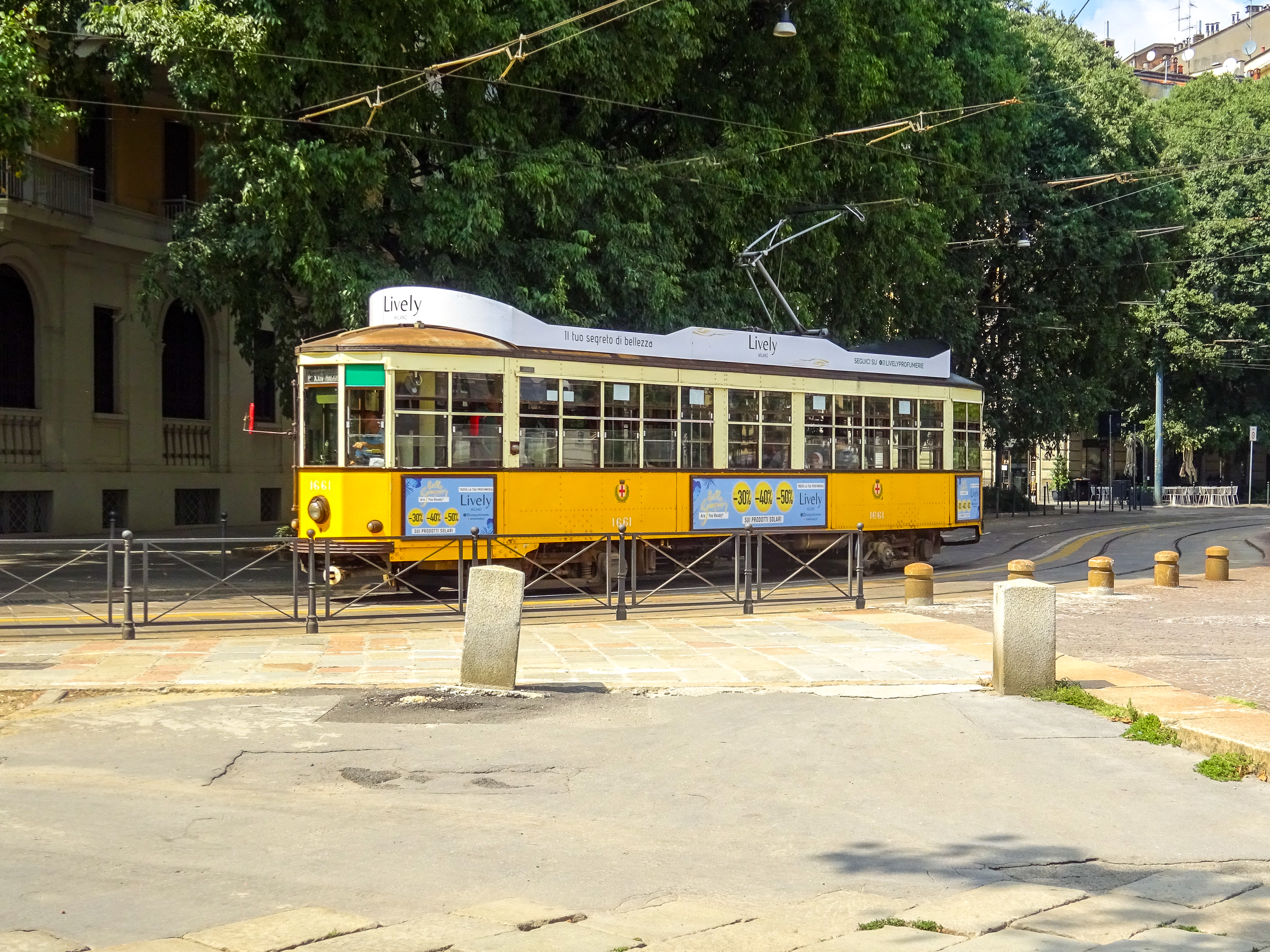
No. 1661 in yellow livery

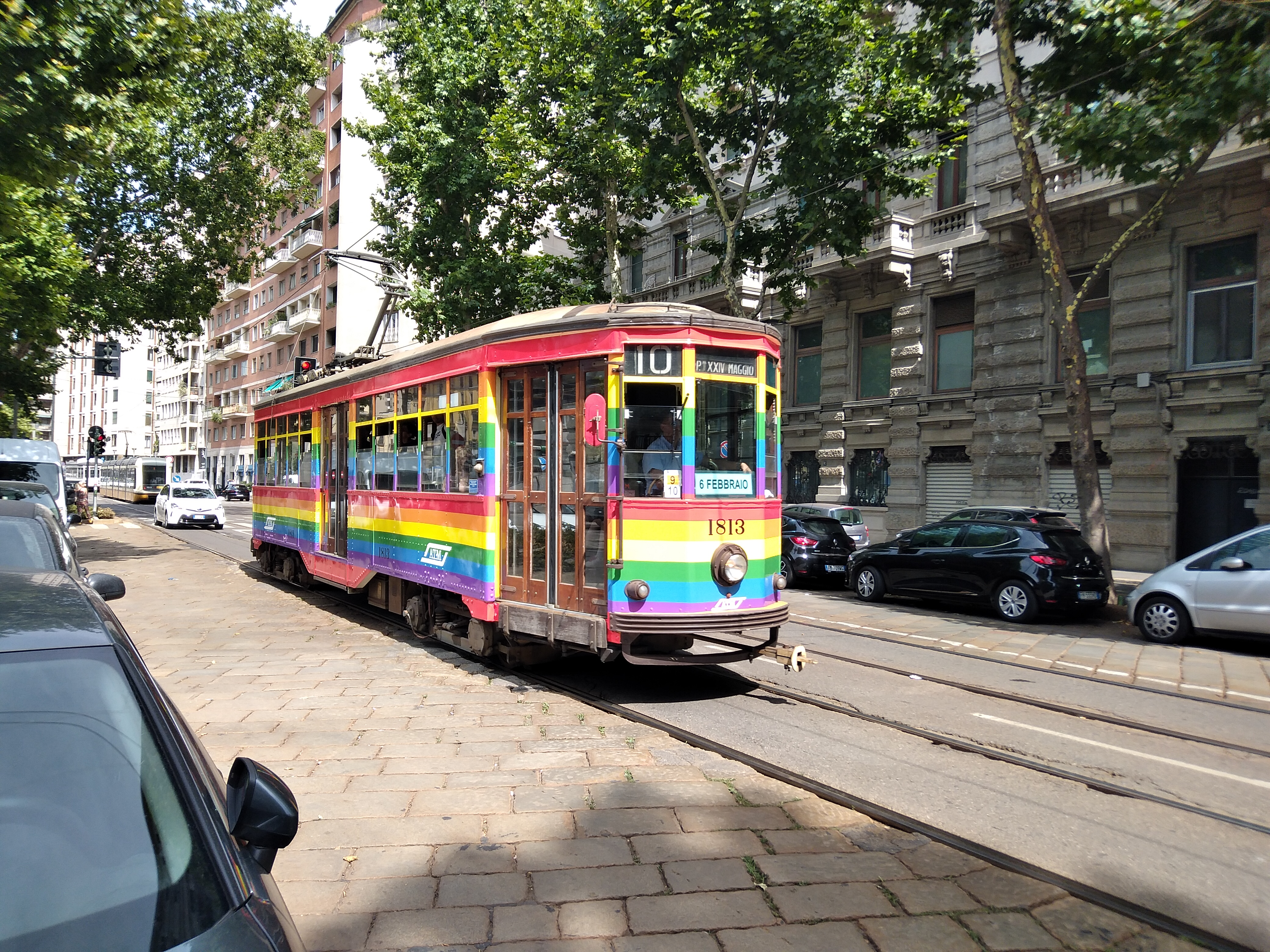
No. 1813 in rainbow livery

== Legacy ==
In 1929 a unit was sent to Frankfurt and tested on the tram network, without success. Another unit was sold to Brussels, where it became model for the series 5000; later it went to Madrid.

In Italy, tramcars similar to the Milan Peter Witt were built for the cities of Genoa, Naples, Padua, Trieste and Turin.

== Reconstructions ==
Two damaged units were used in 1984 to arrange a low-floor prototype, the car no. 4500.
Two units have been restored, respectively in the original state with only two doors, and in the state of the 1950s in green livery.

Many cars were sold to the cities of San Francisco and San Jose, where they work as museum cars.

Car no. 1692 was partially rebuilt for double-ended "keep left" operation in Australia, and ran briefly in Melbourne. It is now at the Sydney Tram Museum.

== Bibliography ==
- Giovanni Cornolò, Giuseppe Severi: Tram e tramvie a Milano 1840-1987. Azienda Trasporti Municipali, Milan 1987.
- Guido Boreani: Un tram che si chiama Milano. Calosci, Cortona 1995. ISBN 8877851139.
