= LVS-97 =

Russian tram

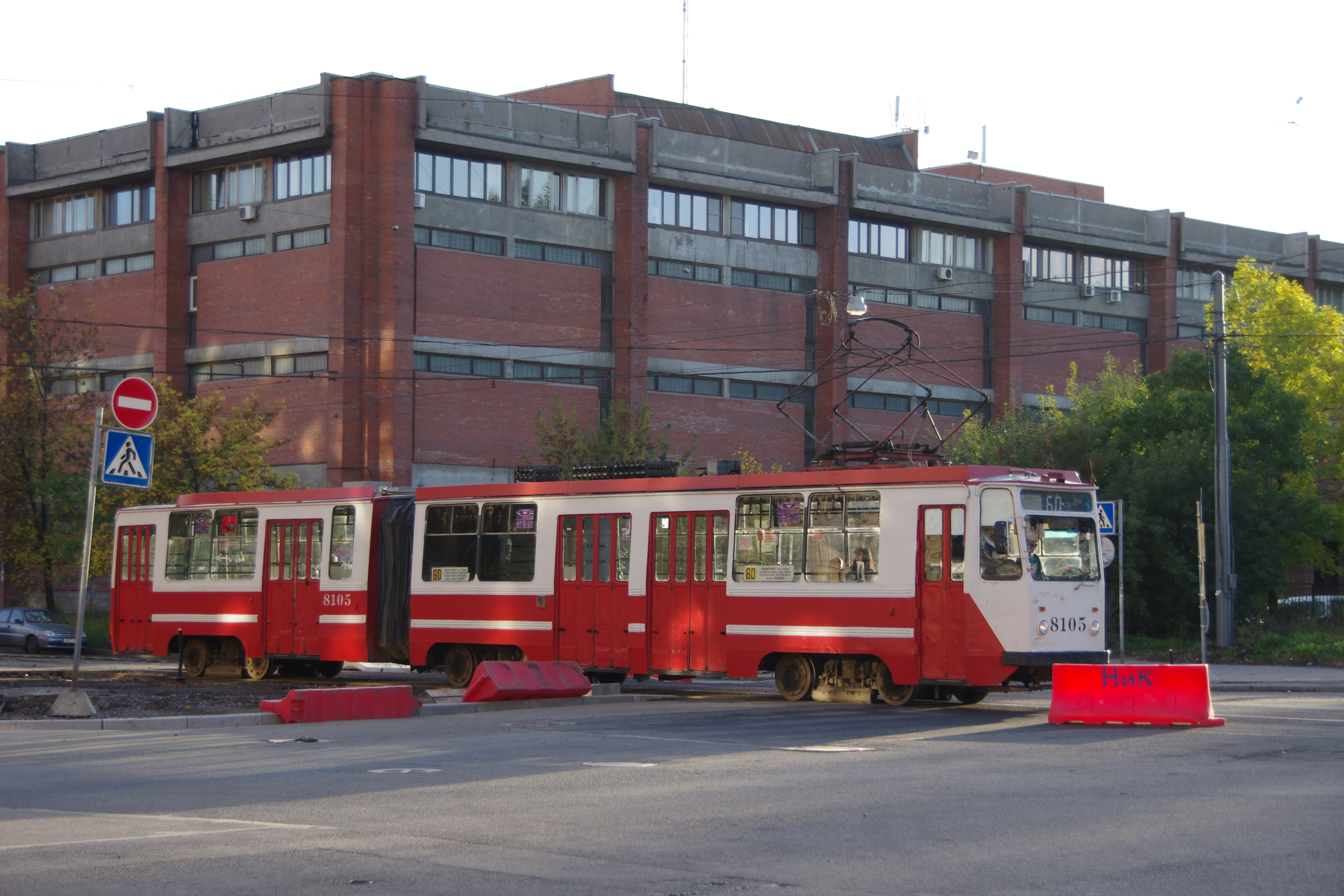
LVS-97 tram in Avtovo district in Saint Petersburg (2012)

LVS-97 (71-147) is a Russian-made six axle tram. LVS denotes «Ленинградский Вагон Сочленёный» (Leningradski Vagon Sochlenyeni) which is an articulated tramcar, made in St. Petersburg. It was produced at the Petersburg Tram Mechanical Factory from 1997 (as its name implies by the 97 suffix) through to 2004.

LVS-97 tramcars operate in St. Petersburg, Kolomna, Krasnoyarsk and were also tested in Vitebsk.

== Technical details ==
Interior of LVS-97 tram on bad tracks in Kolomna

LVS-86 is a broad gauge (1,524 mm (5 ft)) high floor tram (yet with varying floor level in one of the modifications). Its body is continuously welded articulated and has 6 axles. The articulation is suspended, the rear section being supported just by one bogie. Since 2000 (manufacturing number 1518) trams were released with a glass/plastic facing of the front, as well as different door placement in the first section (as in LM-99).

== Modifications ==
- LVS-97K Rheostatic-contactor control system. Used in St. Petersburg and formerly used in Kolomna and Krasnoyarsk.
- LVS-97M MERA thyrystor control system. Two tram cars were built. One of them was tested in Vitebsk, then transferred back to St. Petersburg. At the plant it was rebuilt into LVS-97A with the assignment of the new manufacturing number.
- LVS-97A Asynchronous traction engines. Six trams were built for St. Petersburg.
- LVS-97A-01 (71-151А), rear section uses low floor passenger compartments. The low floor was removed in 2008 during a repair, as the special rear bogie was replaced by a conventional one. One tram built in 2004, scrapped November 2018 after a fire on November 12 2016.
