= LVS-86 =

Tramcar model

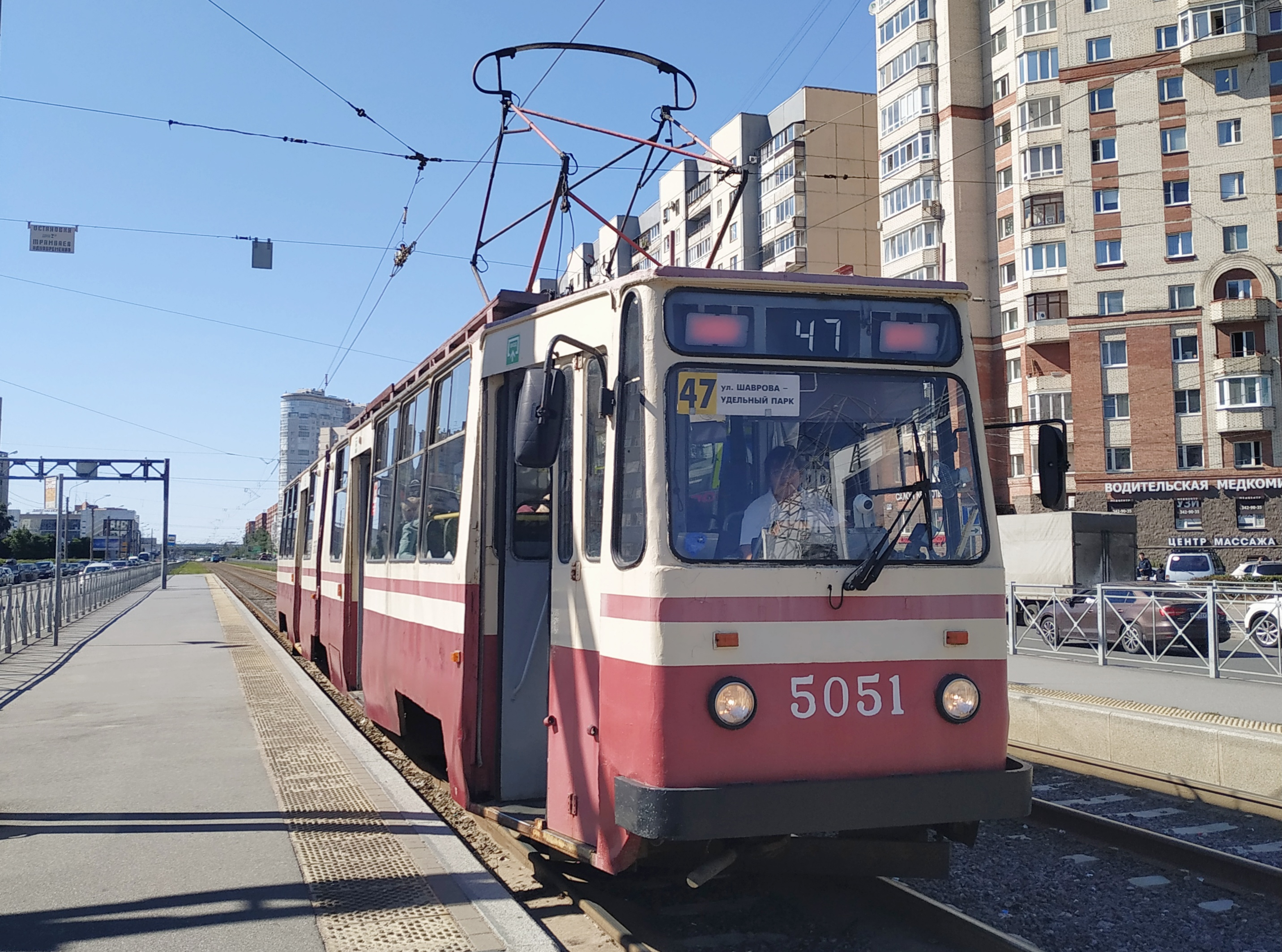
LVS-86 in Saint Petersburg

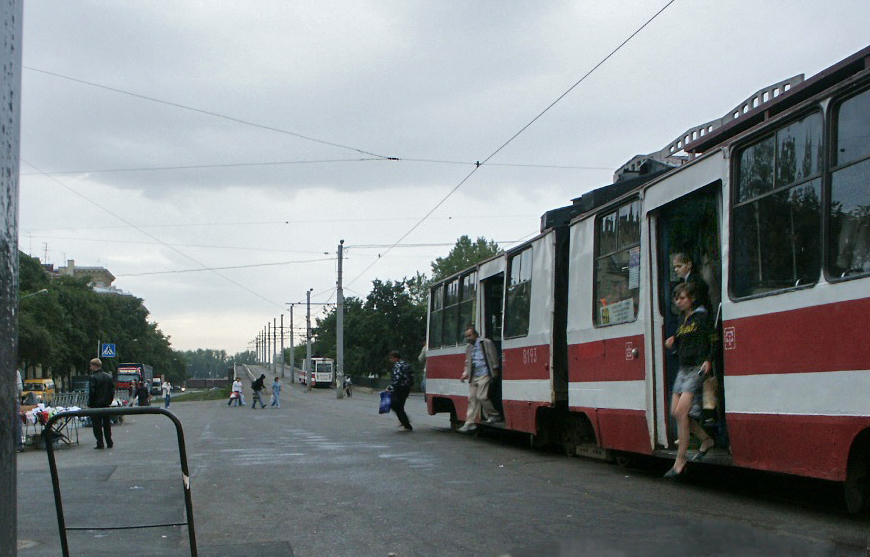
An LVS-86 disembarks passengers.

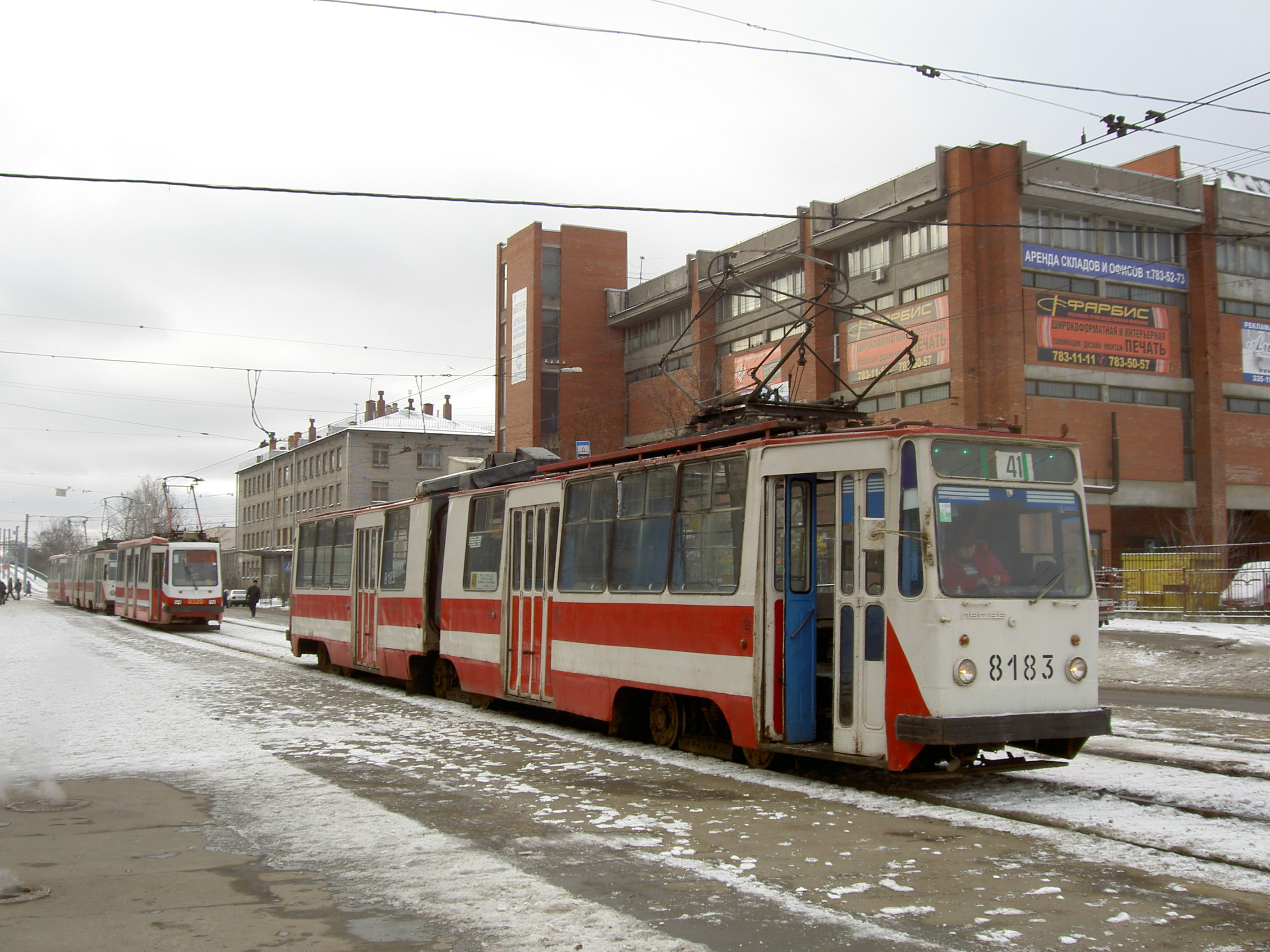
LVS-86 in Saint Petersburg

LVS-86 is a model of tramcar developed at the Leningrad Tram Manufacturing Plant in the former Soviet Union. LVS stands for "Leningrad-made articulated tram" in Russian, and 86 refers to the model year. The design was based on the LVS-80 tramcar. 473 LVS-86s were built from 1987 until 1997. LVS-86s currently run in Saint Petersburg and formerly in Arkhangelsk. Tram operation in Arkhangelsk ceased in July 2004.

== Technical specifications ==
LVS-86 is a 1,524-millimetre (5 ft) Russian gauge tramcar with six axles. Two equal-sized sections articulate around a central mm bogie. Each section has two electric motors which can also act as brakes, supplemented by pneumatic brakes and magnetic track brakes. The central bogie is not motorized. The motors are controlled by potentiometers or thyristors.

The tram has 27 seats and holds 327 riders when fully loaded. Most trams have four-segment folding doors at the front and rear and at the middle of each section. LVS-86 is 22.5 metres long, 2.55 metres wide, and 3.15 m high. Unloaded, it weighs 29.5 tonnes. Multiple trams can be linked together and controlled from a single cab.

== Modifications ==
- LVS-86K Rheostatic-Contactor control system.
- LVS-86T Thyristor control system.
- LVS-86M MERA thyristor control system.
- LVS-86A Asynchronous AC traction. One tram was rebuilt from an LVS-86T in 1997 -- "The first AC traction tram in Russia".
- LVS-86K-M Rheostatic-contactor controls, plastic and glass facing of the front panel.

== See also ==
- Tram
- Tramways in Saint Petersburg
