= Petersburg Tram Mechanical Factory =

Coordinates: 59°58′33″N 30°21′05″E

- Type: Subsidiary
- Industry: Rail transport
- Founded: 1929; 97 years ago
- Defunct: 2015
- Headquarters: St.Petersburg, Russia
- Area served: Worldwide
- Products: Locomotives; High-speed trains Intercity and commuter trains Trams; People movers Signalling systems

Petersburg Tram Mechanical Factory (PTMF) (Russian: Петербу́ргский трамва́йно-механи́ческий заво́д, ПТМЗ) was one of the leading manufacturers of tramcars in Russia and the CIS-countries located in Saint Petersburg. Until 1981 it was the only enterprise in the USSR having tram manufacturing as its core business, The plant was the sole supplier of rolling stock for the tram system of Leningrad, once largest metropolitan tram system in the world.

== History ==
The plant was designed in 1928 and founded in 1929 as a carriage repair plant for the tram system of Leningrad (now Saint Petersburg). Site for the plant on Chugunnaya street was located in Vyborgskaya side, known to host many of the city's metal workshops. The construction was a challenge so the city management had to take personal care of its facilitation.

By 1933, one year before the planned launch of the plant, it was decided to extend its business from repairs to manufacturing of cars - LM (Leningradskiy Motorniy, motor car) and LP (Leningradskiy pricepnoy, trailer car). In 1934 the plant delivered its first trams.

Soon upon the Nazi invasion the city appeared in siege and by 15 December 1941 shortage of electric power halted the trams for four months. The plant was profiled to produce warfare and engine repair. With the siege lifted in 1944, tram cars production resumed.

In 1966 the first 6-axle articulated tram in USSR, the LVS-66, was produced by the plant. In 1973 the plant launches manufacturing of LM-68 type trams, making over 2100 units in total, since 1986 the plant produced LVS-86 type trams.

In 1981 the plant developed a multiple unit control system for ZiU-9 trolleybuses, based on design of Vladimir Veklich. The system was used in trolleybuses in Leningrad, Kiev and other cities of the USSR.

In 1993 during the Russia's transition to the market economy the state-owned plant was privatized and incorporated as St.Peterburg Tram Mechanical Plant, later (in 2003) becoming a part of Dedal Group, owner of Vagonmash, subway train manufacturing plant.

Since 2006 the plant produces LM-99 type tramcars of various modifications, supplied to Saint Petersburg, Moscow, and other cities in Russia. Same year the plant built a sample of LVS-2005 tramcar, which became a prototype of the new line of low-floor trams. The plant also produced small series of PTZ-type trolleybuses for domestic use, as well as for Velikiy Novgorod, Petrozavodsk and Ryazan.

Later the plant manufactured newly-designed 6-axle Pioneer (model 71-152), 4-axle Solo (model 71-134) and 4-axle LM-2008 for St.Petersburg, as well as 4-axle LM-99 EMN for Odessa, model 71-154М for Kiev, LM-2008 for Moscow and Donetsk, LVS-2005 for Barnaul. The plant was chosen as the rolling stock supplier for Volgograd rapid underground tram system, delivering first train with passenger capacity of 350 by 2008. The last cars of type LM-2008 released in 2012 went to Mariupol.

In May 2013 went bankrupt and the production was halted. The assets of the plant were sold for 1 bn rubles, most its buildings were demolished. However, the plans for residential redevelopment of the PTMF's territory faced opposition from the city management. By 2023 plans were revealed to locate there subway train depot for the projected Ringway Route.

== Product line ==
=== Trams ===
- LM–33 (1933-1939), four-axle
- LM–36 (1936-?)
- LM–47 (1948-1949), four-axle
- LM–49 (1949-1960)
- LP–49 (1949-1960, 1965-1968), trailer van for LM49
- LM–57 (1957-1968)
- LM–68 (1968-1974)
- LM–68M (1974-1992)
- LV–S80 (1980-1984), six-axle articulated tram
- LVS–86 (71-86, 1987-1997), six-axle articulated tram
- LM–93 (71-132, 1993-1999), four-axle tram
- LVS–93 (1993-1994), eight-axle articulated three-section tram
- LVS–97 (71-147, 1997-2004), six-axle articulated tram
- LM–99 (71-134, 1999-2005), four-axle tram
- LM–99 AV/AVN/AE/AEN (2005-2008), modernised LM99 version with updated bodywork
- LM–2000 (2000-2005)
- LVS–2005 (71-152, 2006-2009), six-axle articulated tram with a variable level of the floor
- LM–2008 (71-153, 2008-2012), four-axle tram with a variable level of the floor
- LVS–2009 (2008-2012), two-sided three-piece articulated tram

=== Trolleybuses ===
- PTZ210 (2000-2004), four-door
- PTZ5283 (2000-2004), four-door

== Gallery ==
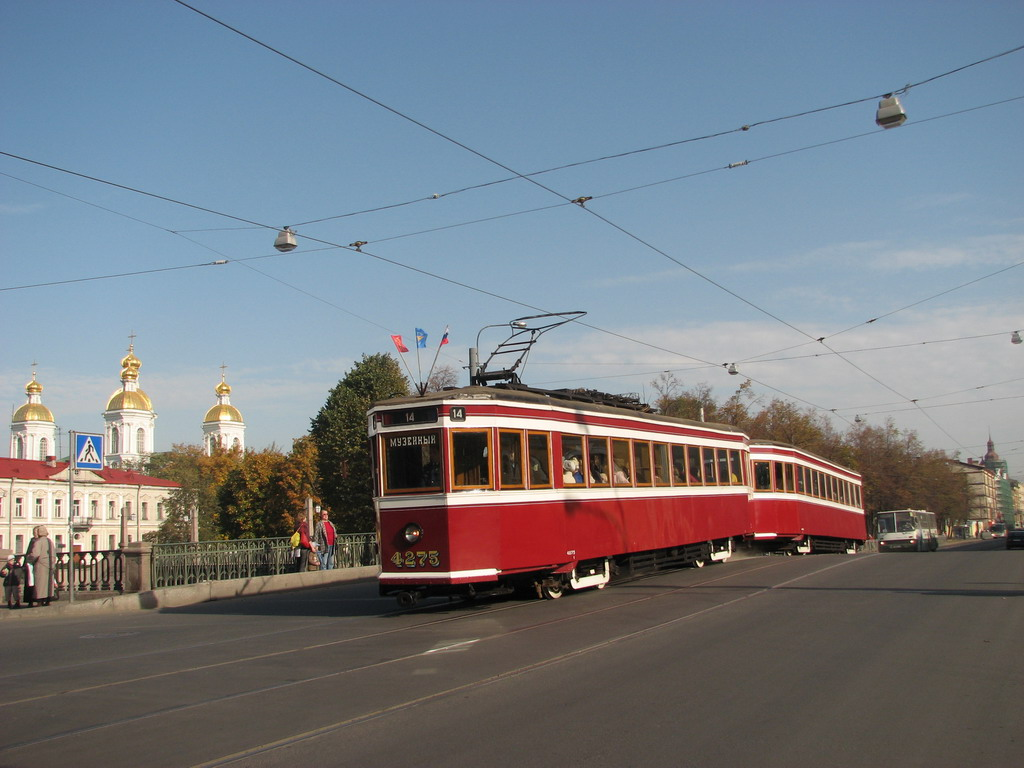
LM-33 at Staro-Nikolsky bridge in Saint Petersburg

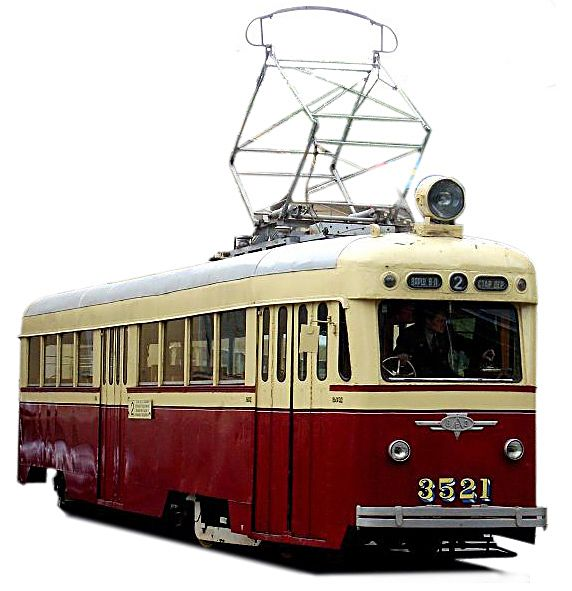
LM47

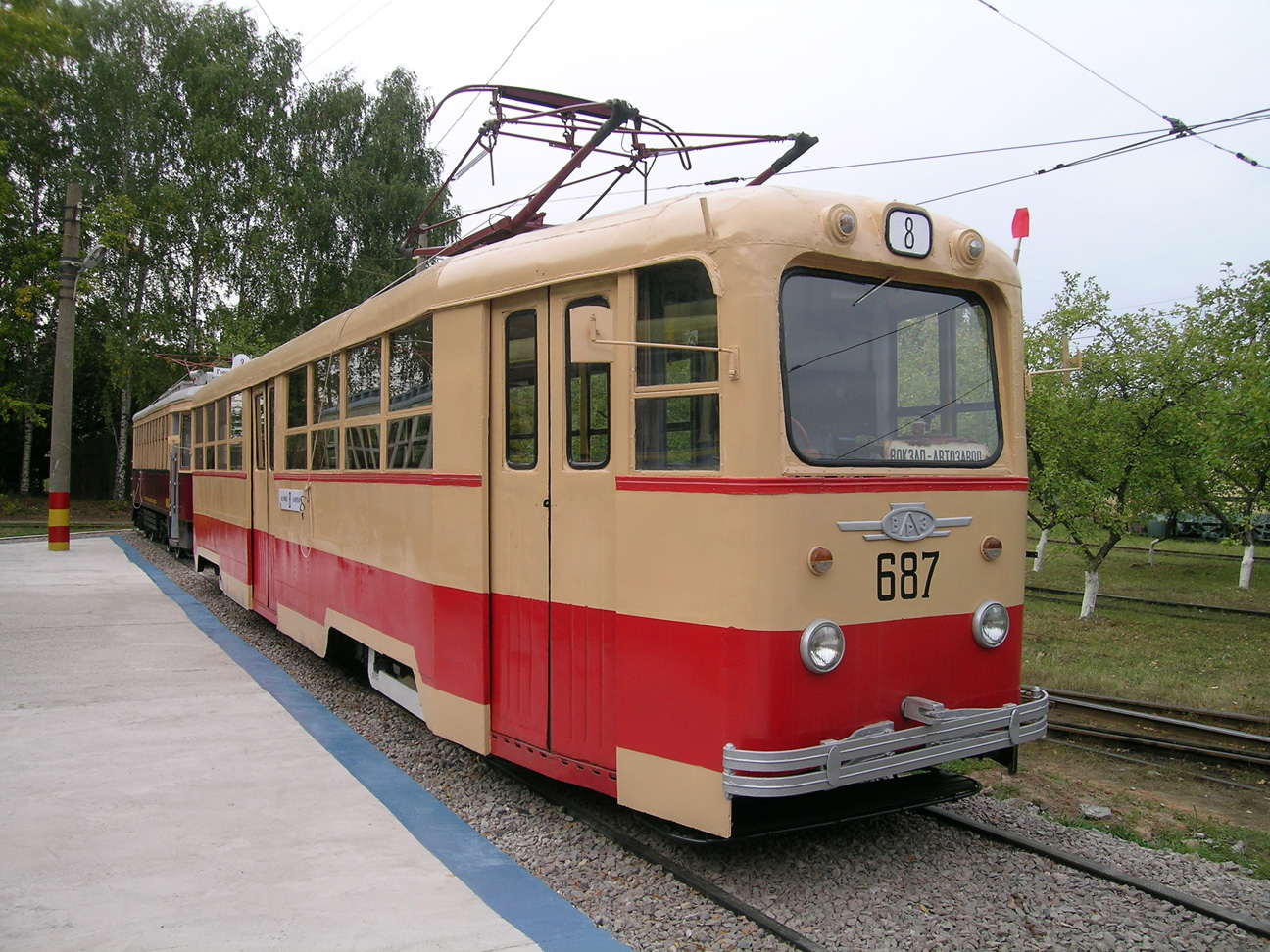
Tram LM-49 in Nizhny Novgorod electric transport museum

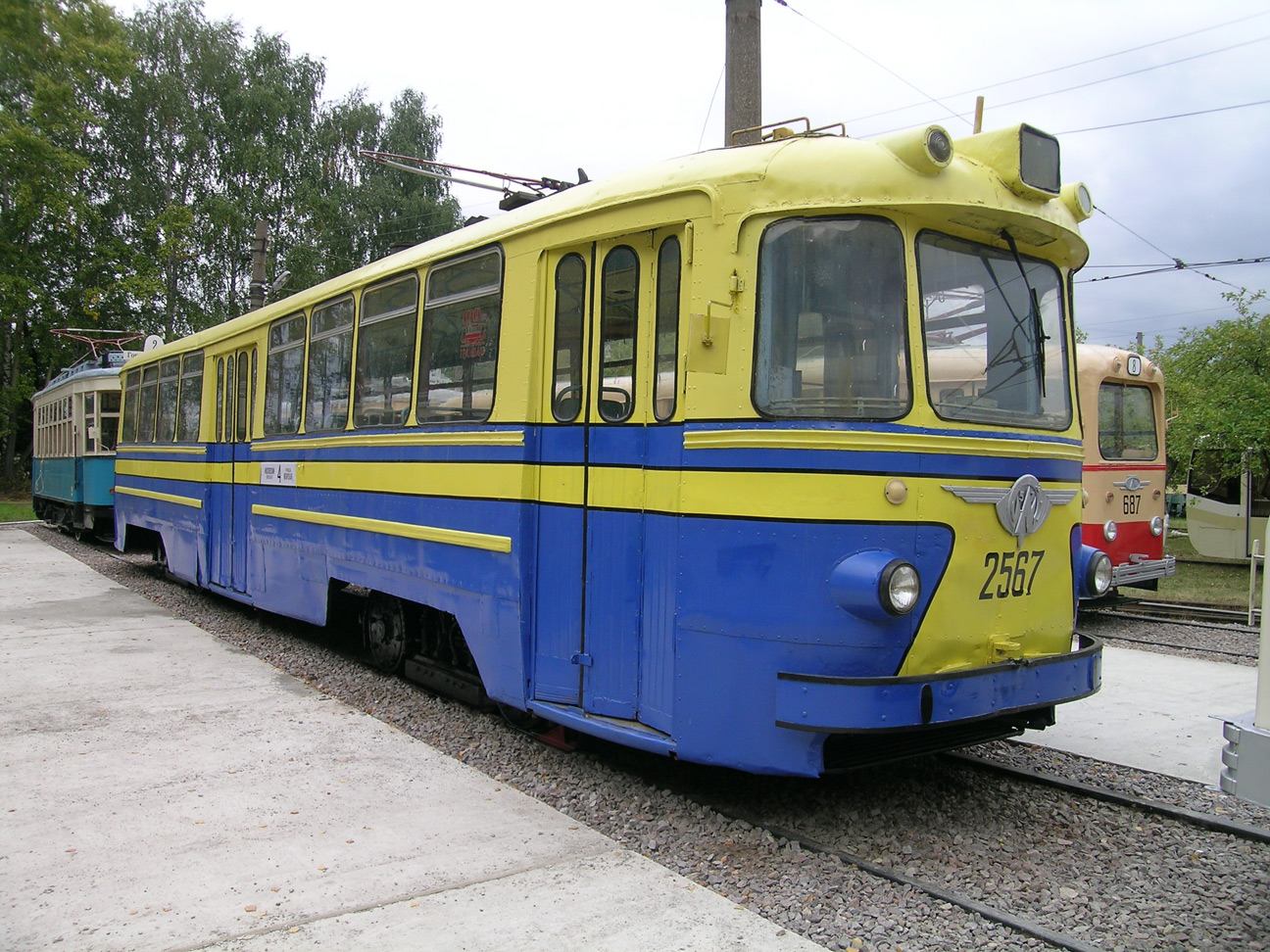
LM57 in Nizhny Novgorod electric transport museum

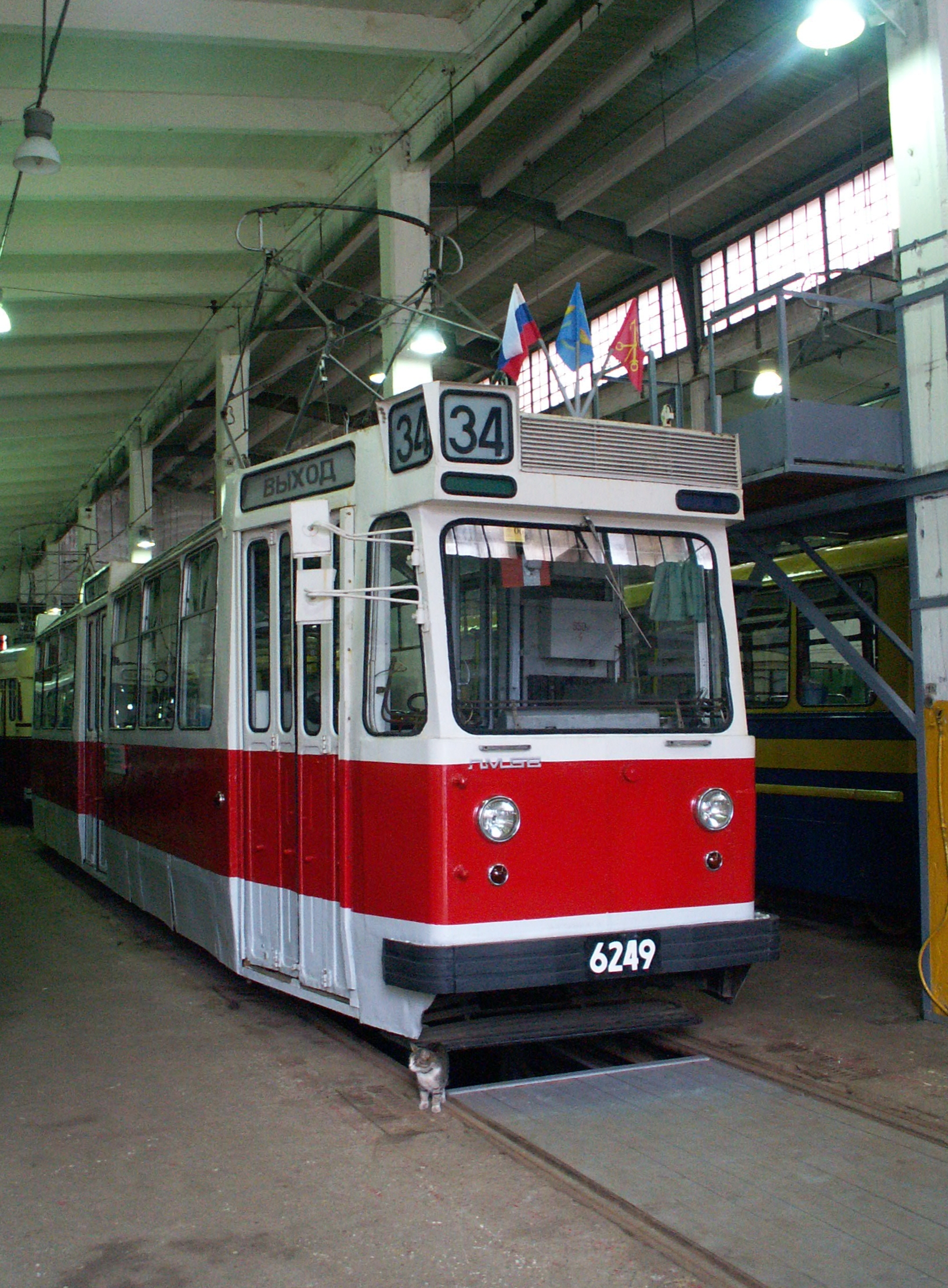
LM-68 in the 1st depot tramparka Leonov. Saint Petersburg

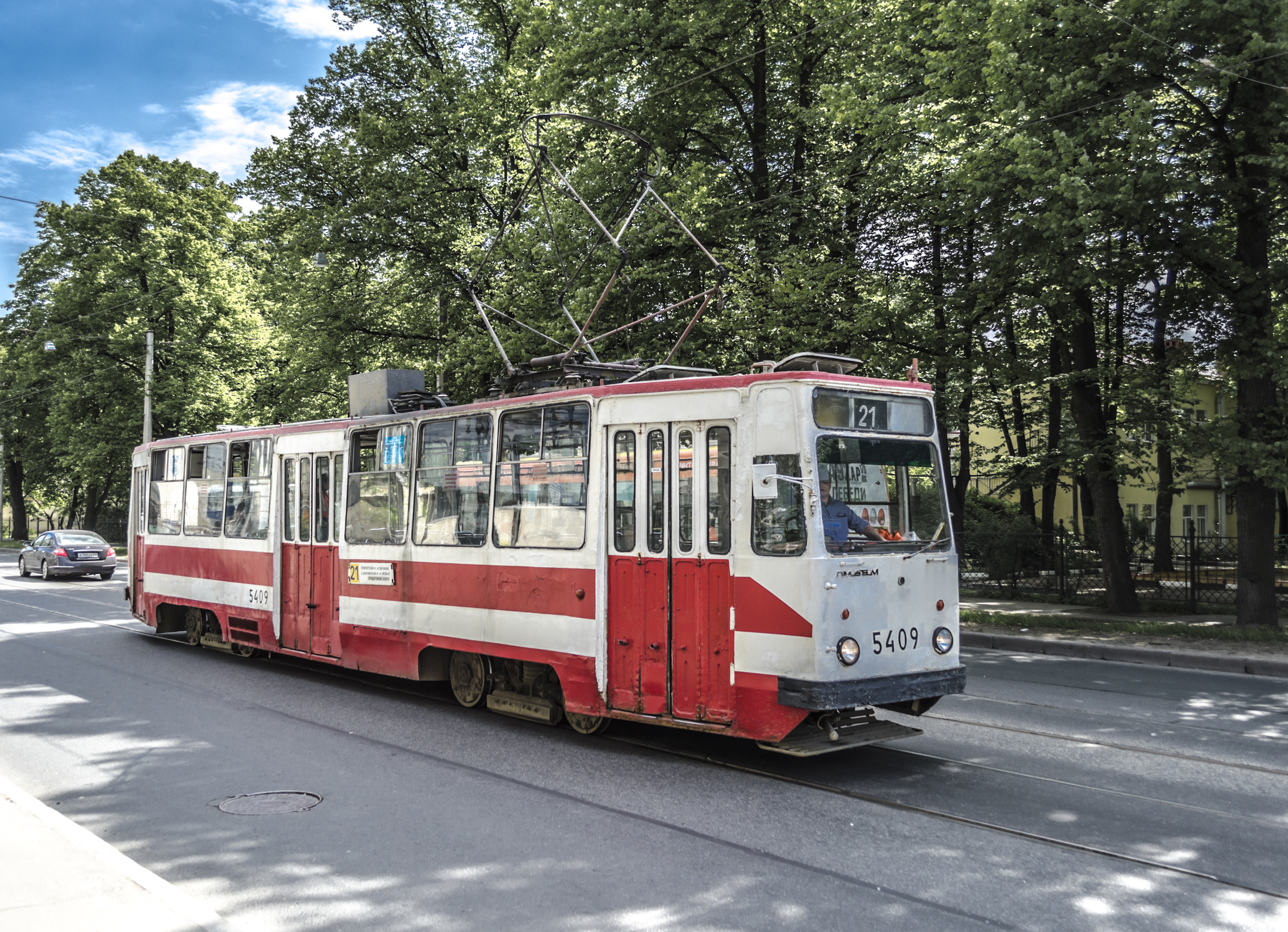
Tram LM-68M in Saint Petersburg, Russia

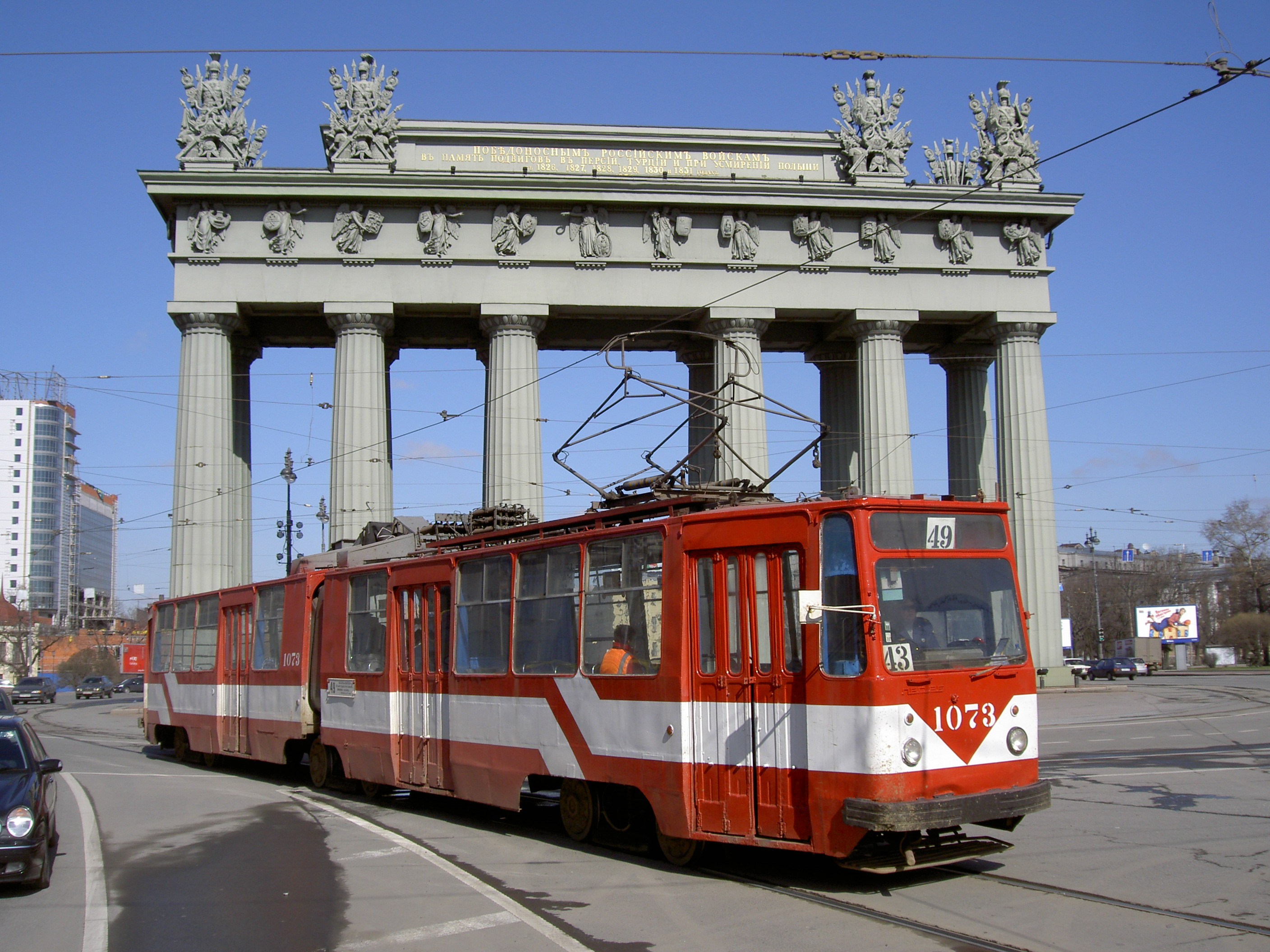
Tram LVS86 at Moskovskiye Vorota square in Saint Petersburg

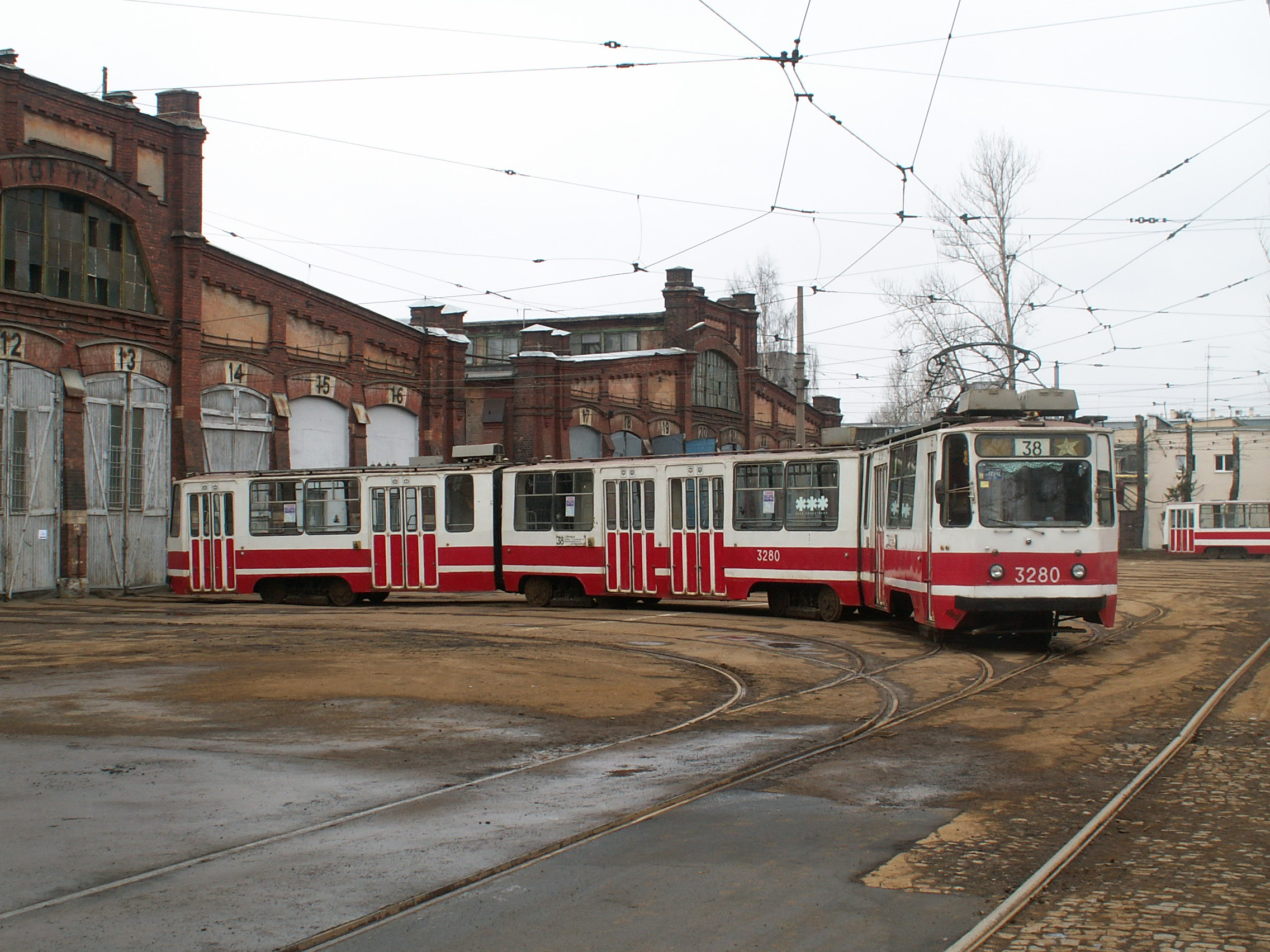
Tram LVS-93 at Vasileostrovsky depot in St. Petersburg

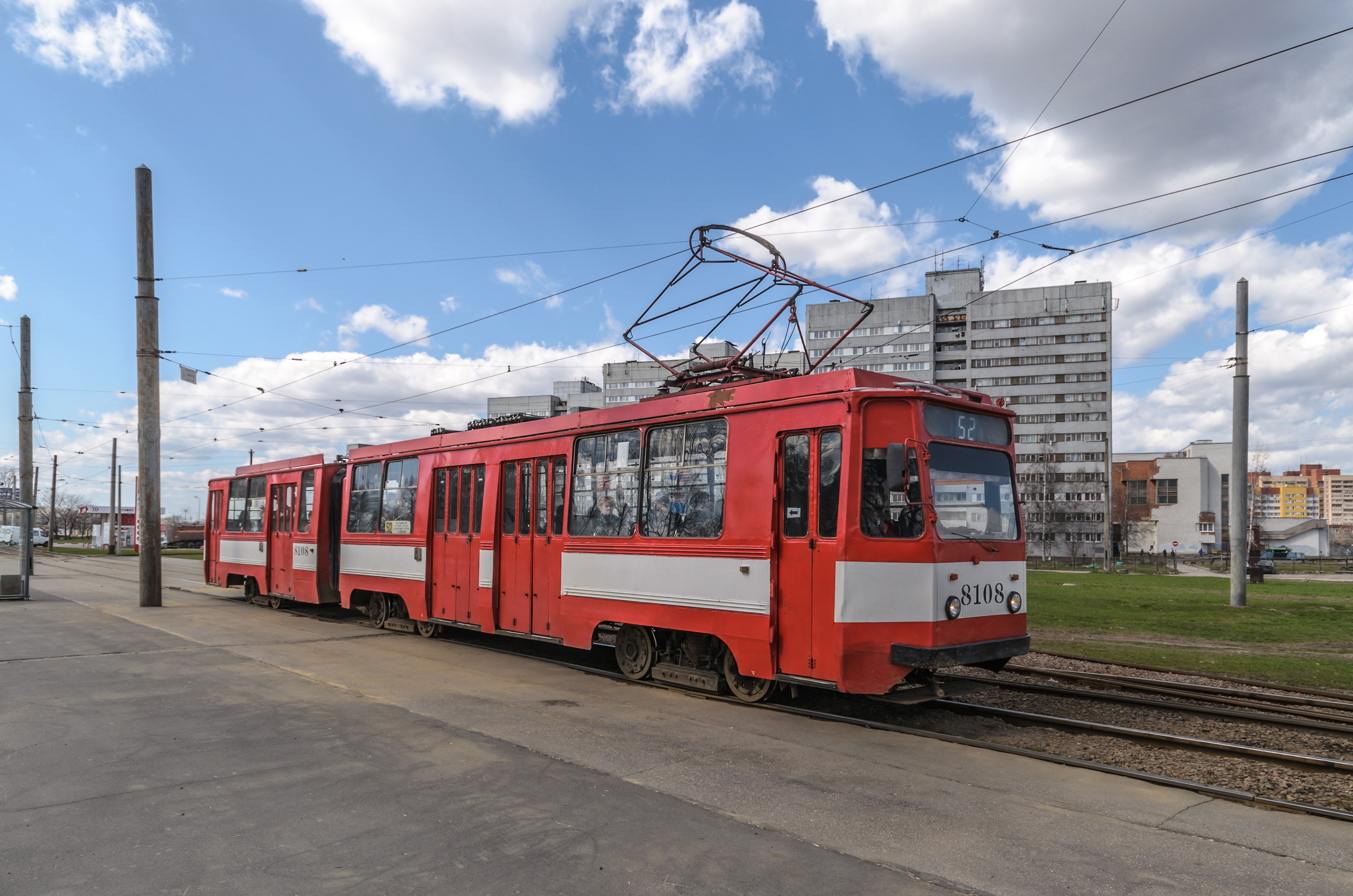
Tram LVS-97 on Stachek avenue in Saint Petersburg

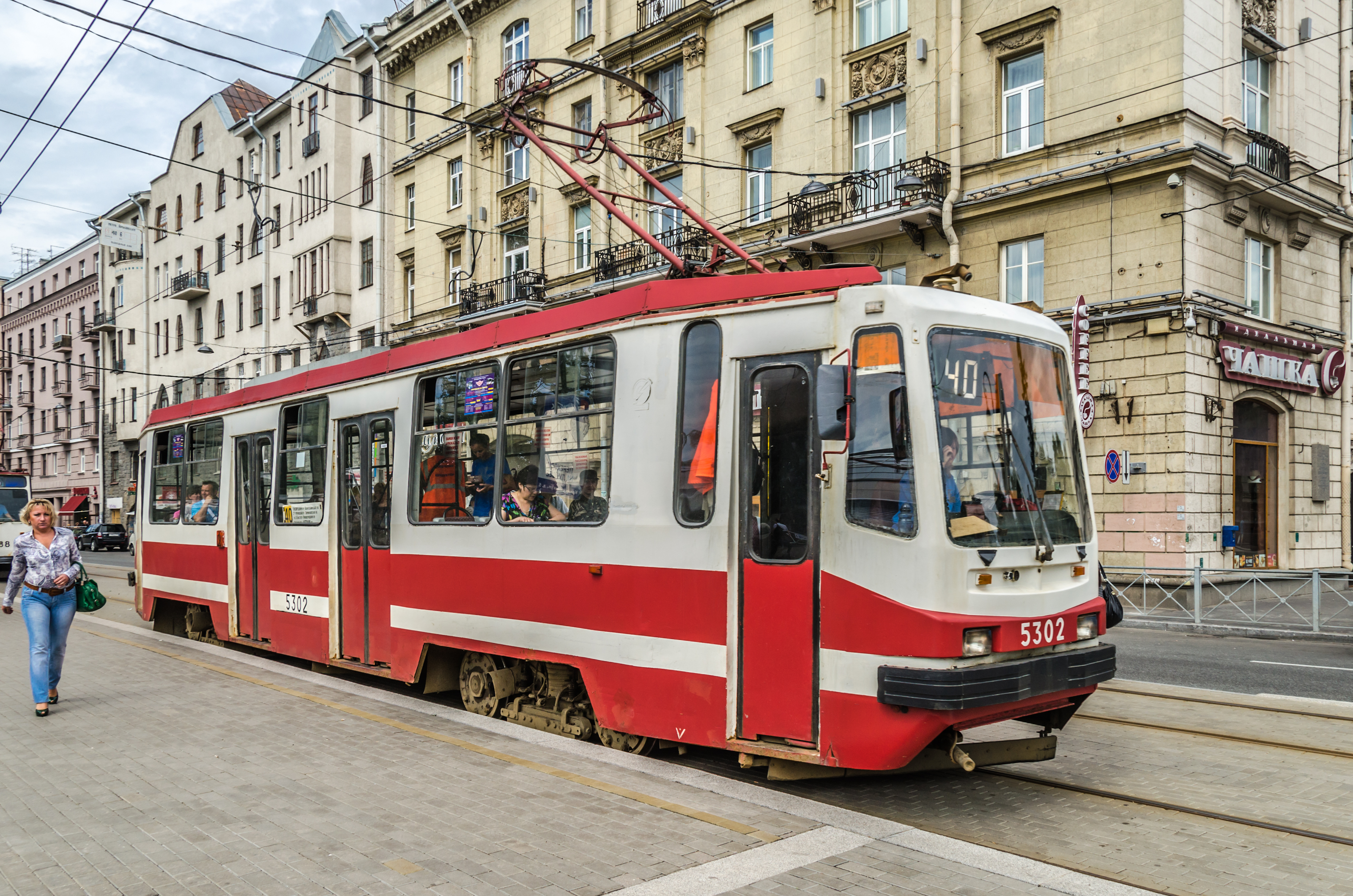
Tram LM-99 on Kronverkskiy avenue in Saint Petersburg

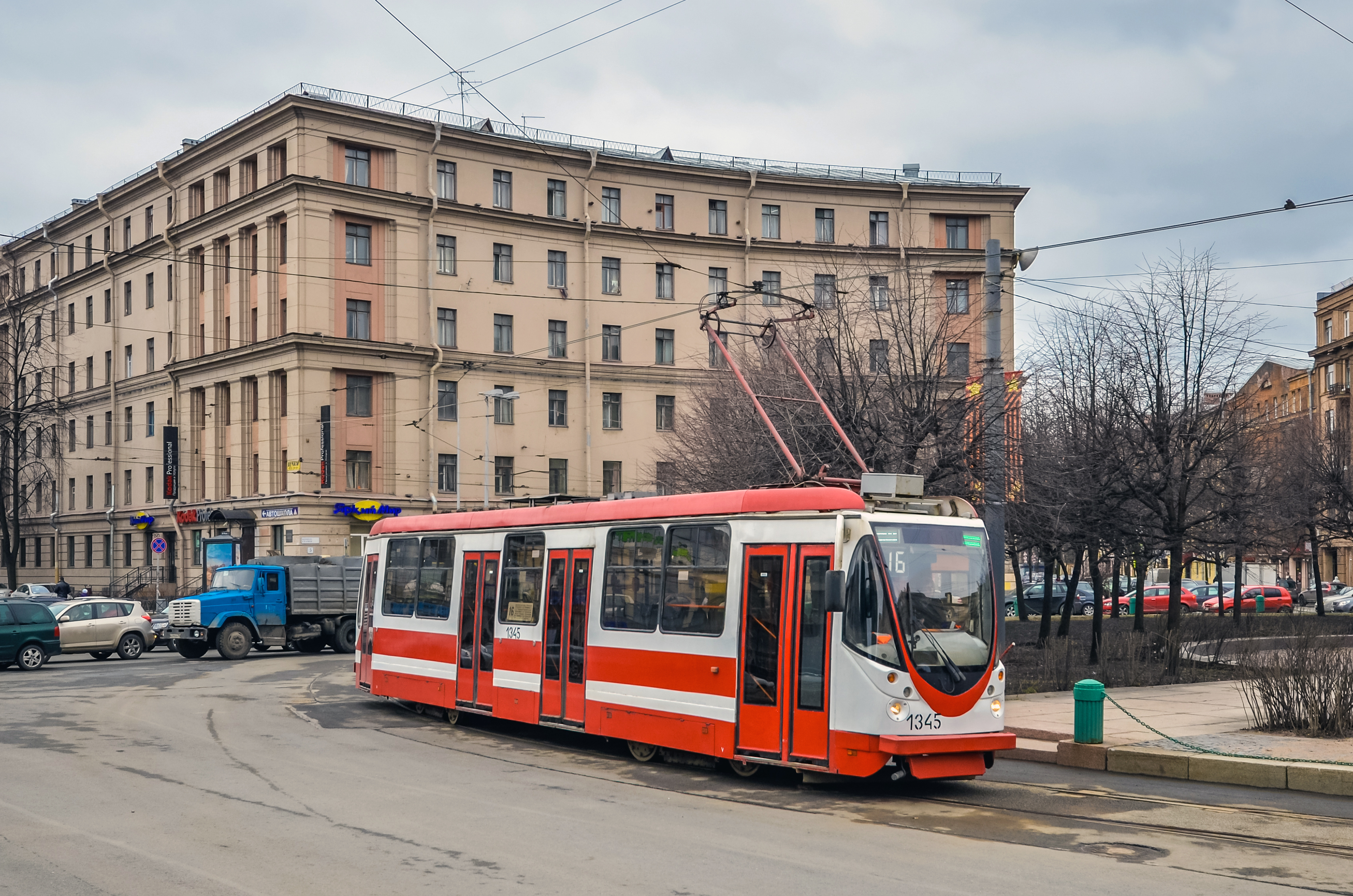
Tram LM-99AVN in Saint Petersburg

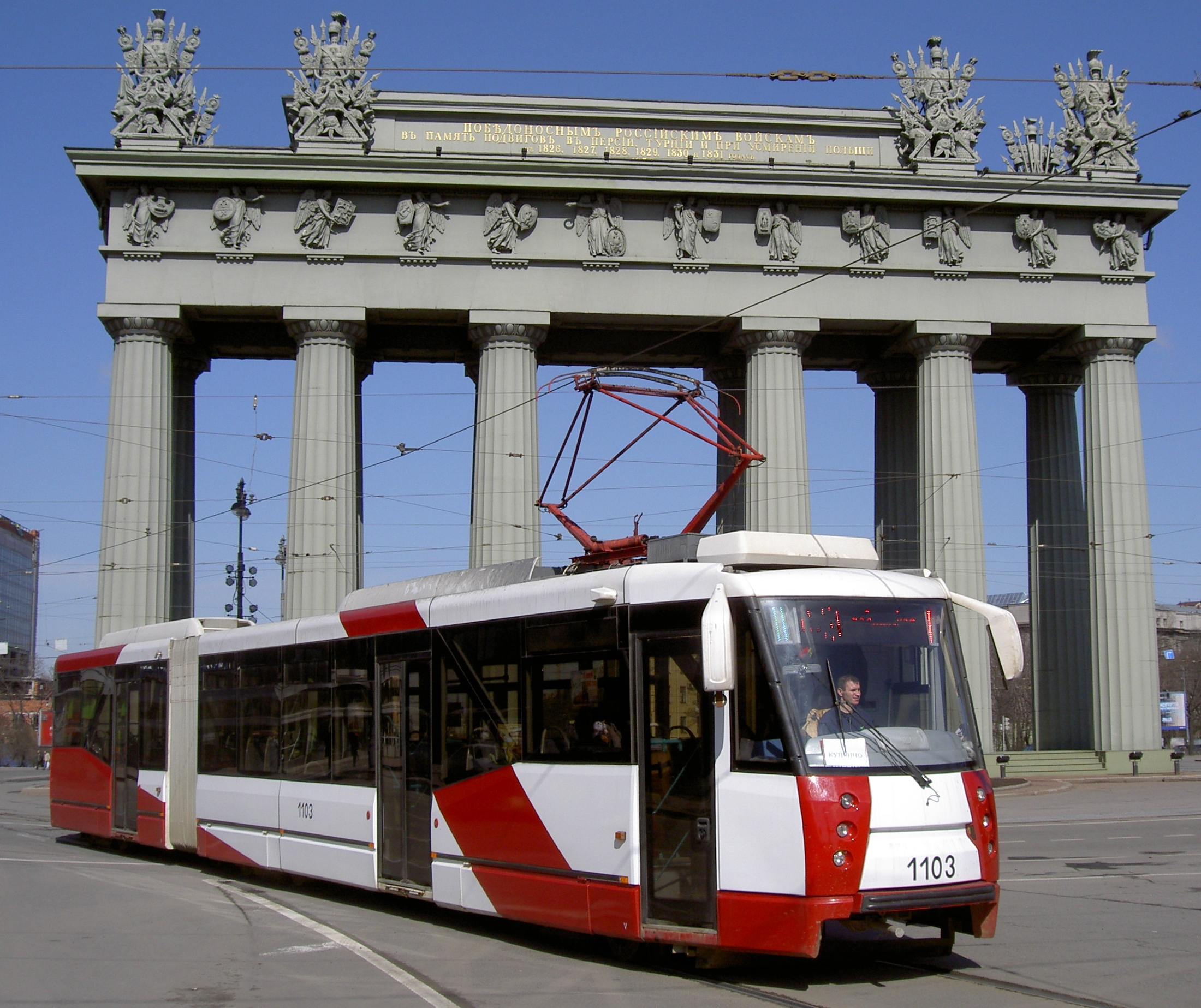
LVS2005

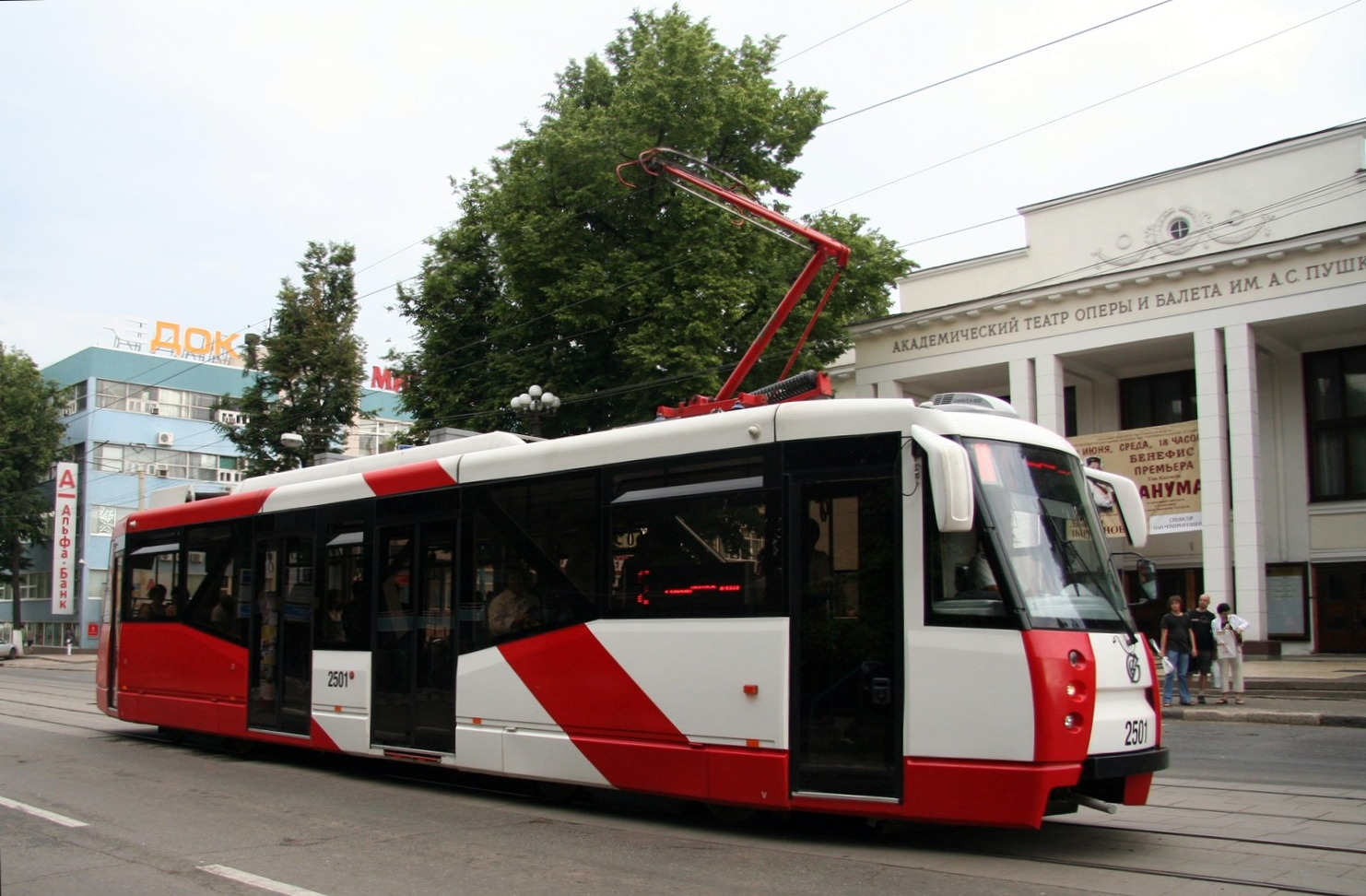
The 71-153 model tramcar on Belinskiy Street, Nizhny Novgorod, Russia.

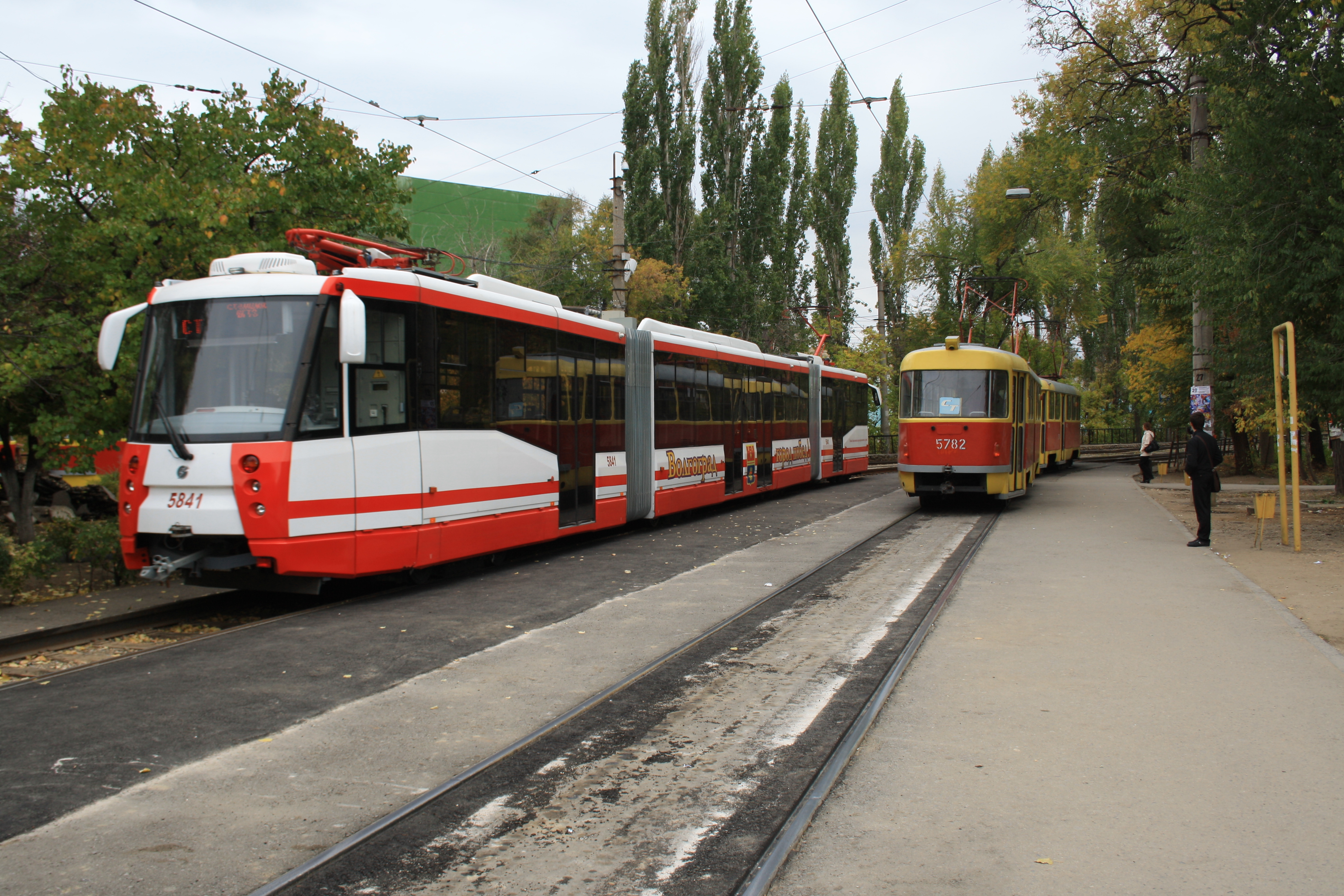
LVS-2009 in Volgograd.
