= Buses in Saint Petersburg =

Public transport in Saint Petersburg

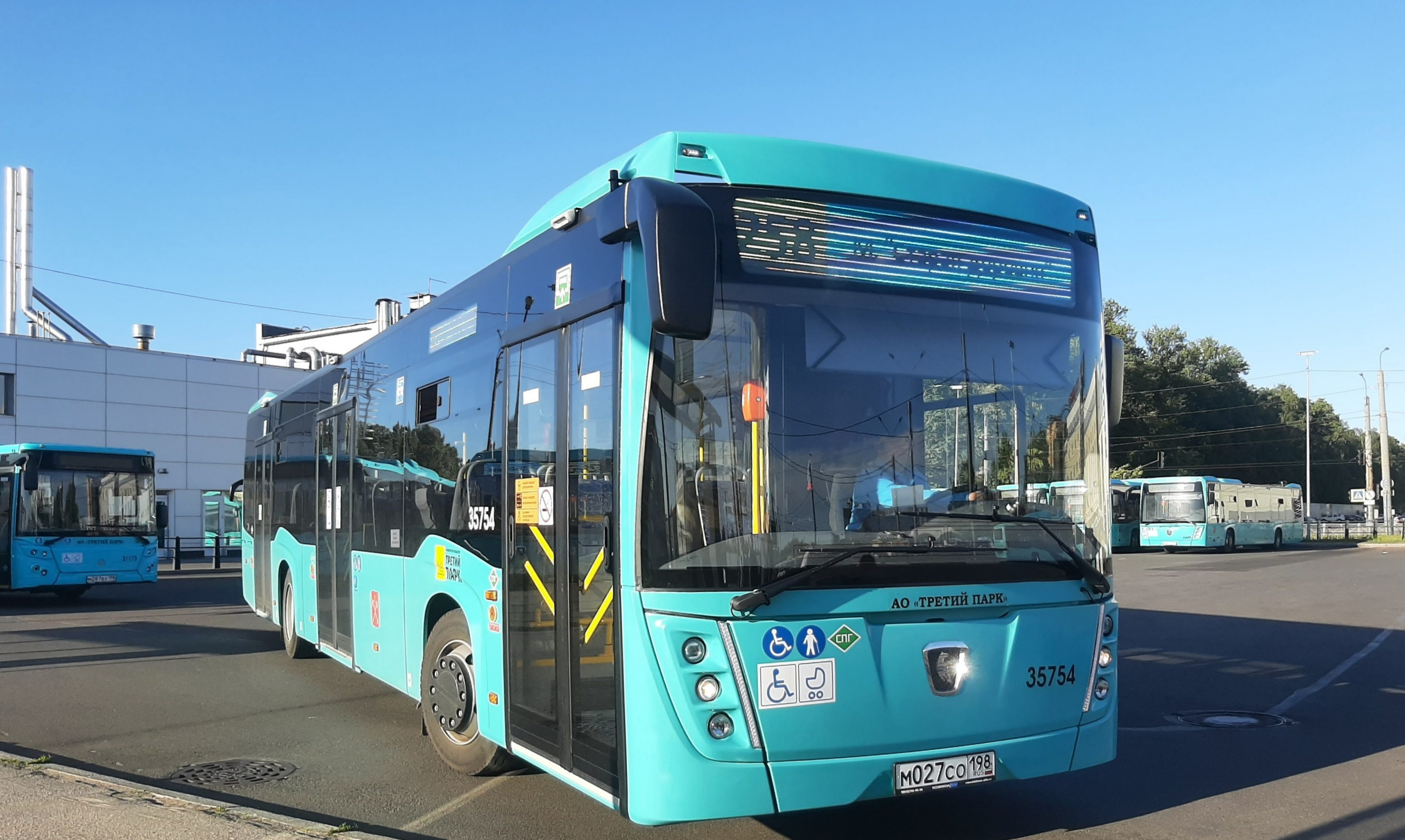
Russian bus NefAZ-5299-40-57 LNG of Third Park JSC

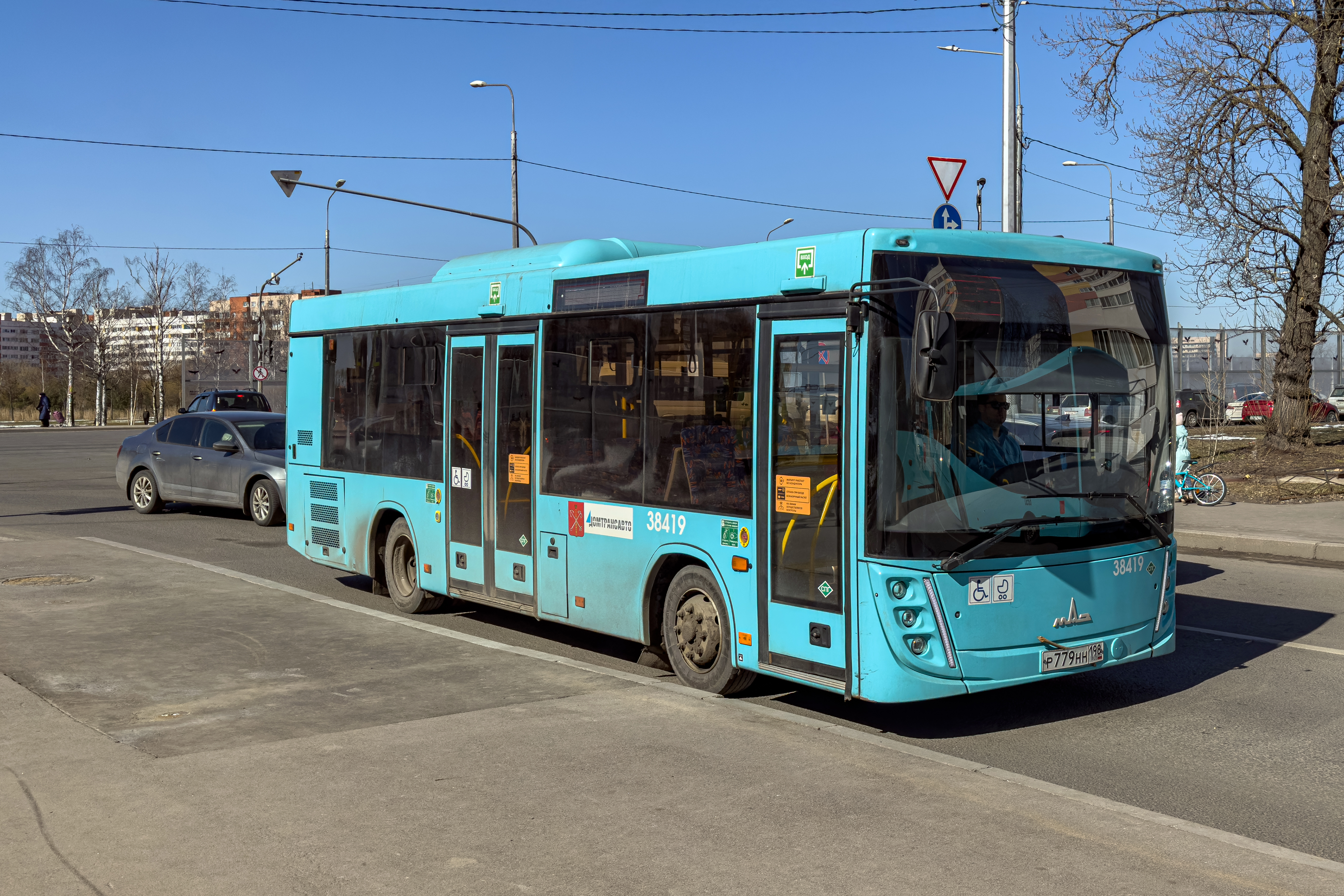
An LNG-powered MAZ-206.947 of Domtransauto LLC.

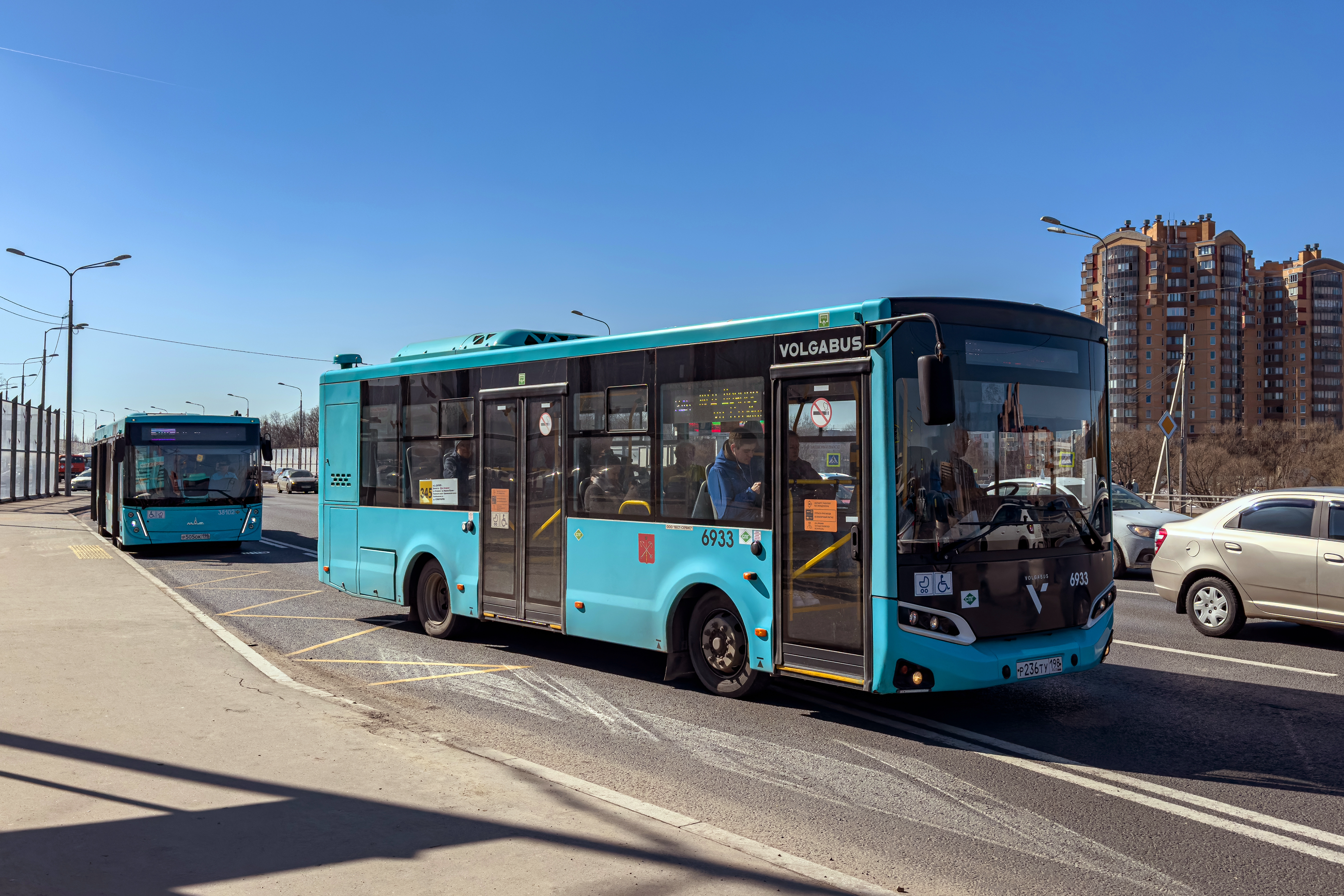
LNG-powered Volgabus-4298.G4 of West-Service LLC departing from the bus stop.

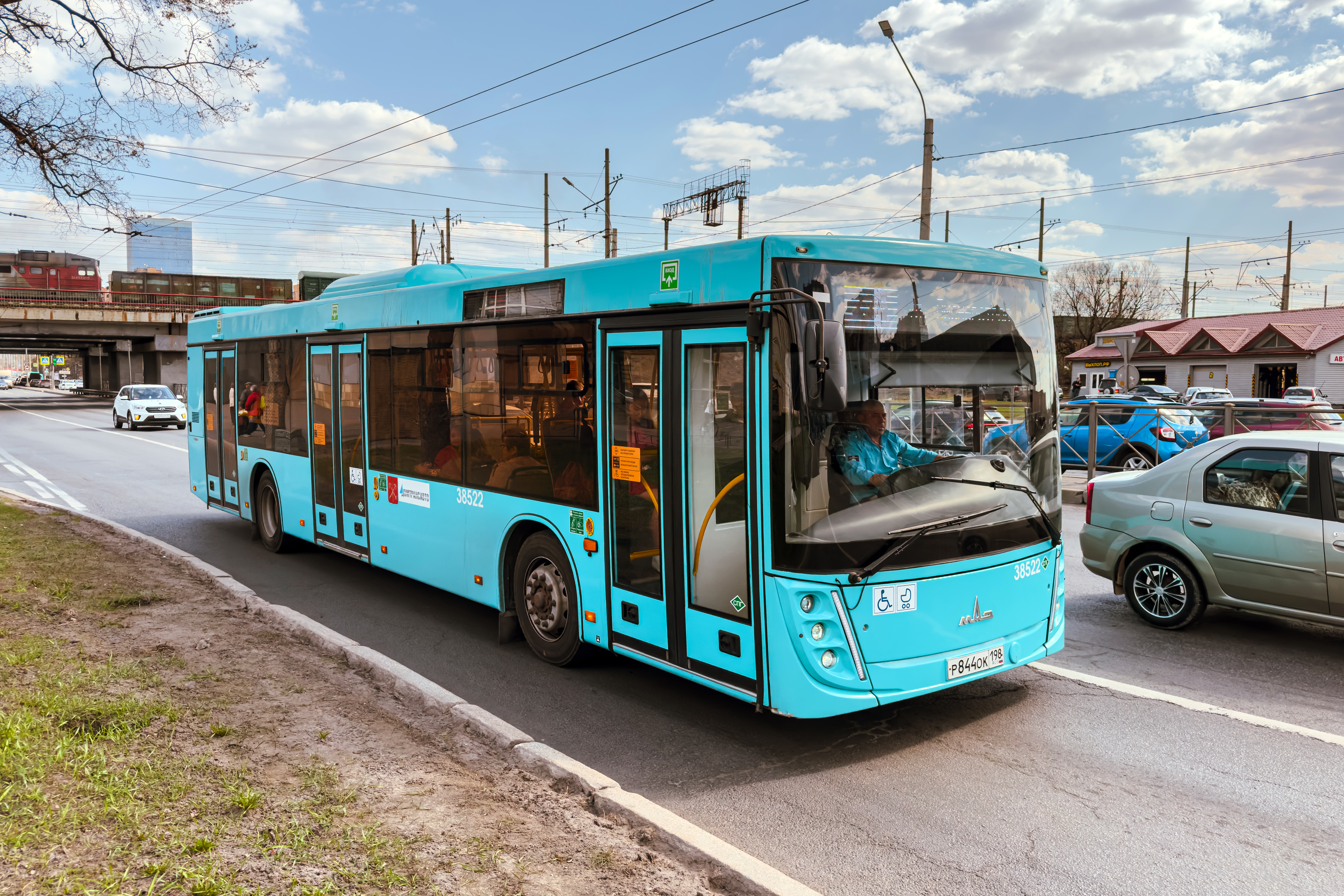
An LNG-powered MAZ-203.947 of Domtransauto LLC

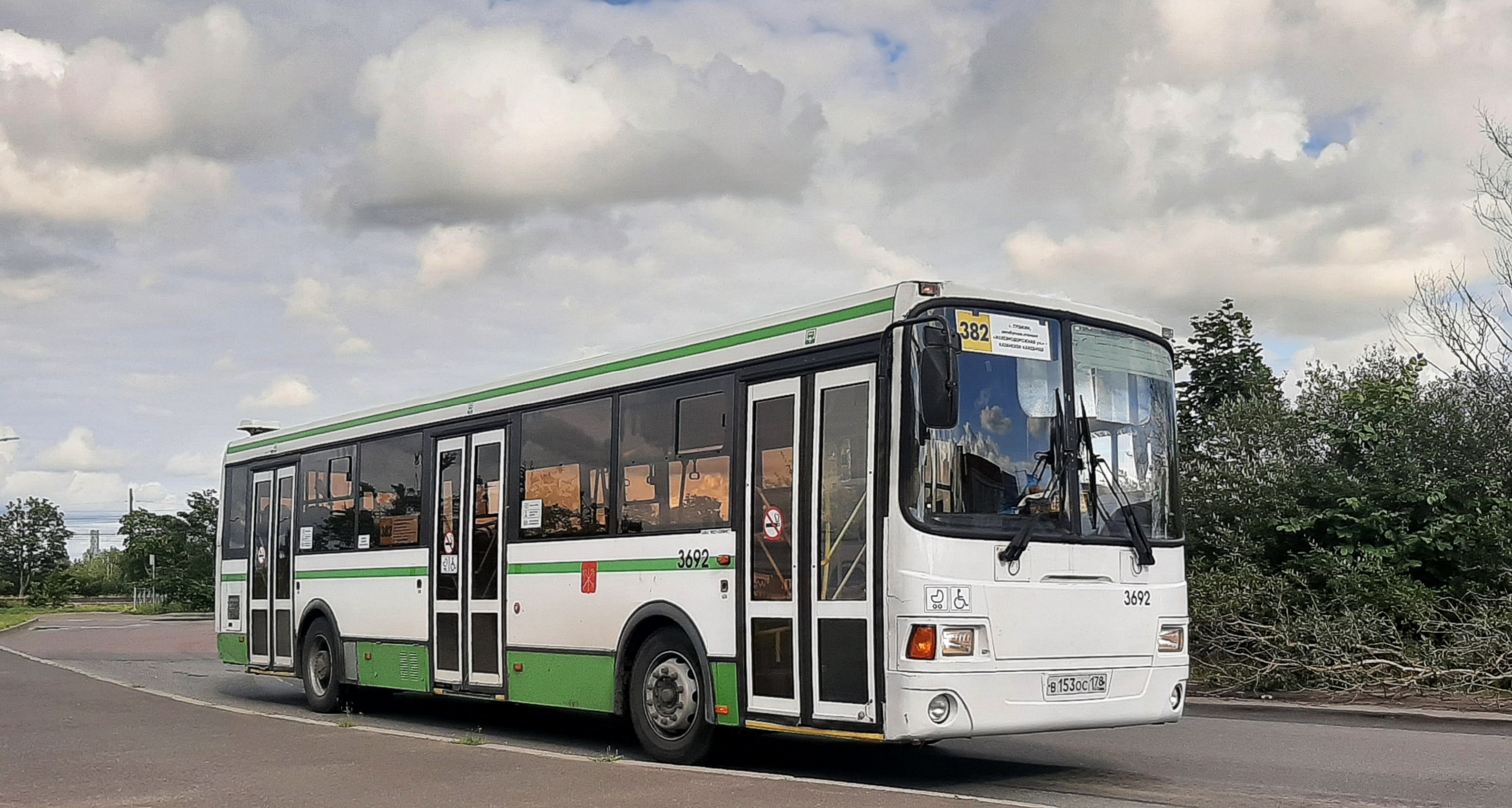
West-Service LLC older stock bus of type LiAZ-5293, no longer in use

Petersburg Bus (Петербу́ргский авто́бус) is one of the transport systems of the city of Saint Petersburg and Leningrad Oblast. It is operated by the Committee for Transportation of Saint Petersburg Government (Комитет по транспорту Правительства Санкт-Петербурга) with operations subcontracted to carriers including Passazhiravtotrans (state unitary enterprise) and West-Service LLC, Third Park РJSC, Domtransauto LLC, Taksi LLC (Taxi).

Fares per trip are ₽65 if paid via Podorozhnik card or ₽95 if paid by bank card; cash cannot be used for payment. Discounts are given if transferring from another form of public transport.

Night buses operate in the summer months, when the bridges spanning the Neva River are raised.

== History ==
Attempts to organize a passenger bus service in Saint Petersburg were first undertaken by private entrepreneurs. In 1901, Ippolit Romanov demonstrated an omnibus with an electric battery of his own design in St. Petersburg – the first electric bus. In 1902, Pyotr Frese manufactured an 8-seat open horse-drawn omnibus based on a truck with a French engine from De Dion-Bouton. Both designer-entrepreneurs intended to open a regular bus service in St. Petersburg and even received permission from the City Council to operate their buses, but abandoned this idea due to unfavorable conditions.

The first buses began to circulate in 1907 and were operated by Saint Petersburg Automobile-Omnibus Company (Санкт-Петербургское товарищество автомобильно-омнибусного сообщения).

During World War I and the October Revolution, public transport was halted.

The bus system was relaunched on July 8, 1926. The first Russian-made bus was Ya-6 which was manufactured by ARZ. The first bus company was Lenkomtrans (Ленкомтранс) which was later renamed to Passazhiravtotrans (Пассажиравтотранс).

During World War II, all the transportation was operated by the Red Army.

In March 1945, the city council recovered the bus system and started to manufacture buses made by AZUL factory. After the dissolution of the Soviet Union, the buses were operated by Passazhiravtotrans, which become the main operator.

In 2022, marshrutkas were banned from operating in Saint Petersburg and the bus map was redrawn.

Beginning in 2022, new buses, all colored in cyan and powered by CNG or LNG, with air-conditioning, validators, electronic destination displays inner displays, and USB-chargers were purchased.

=== Early bus-like transport in Saint Petersburg ===
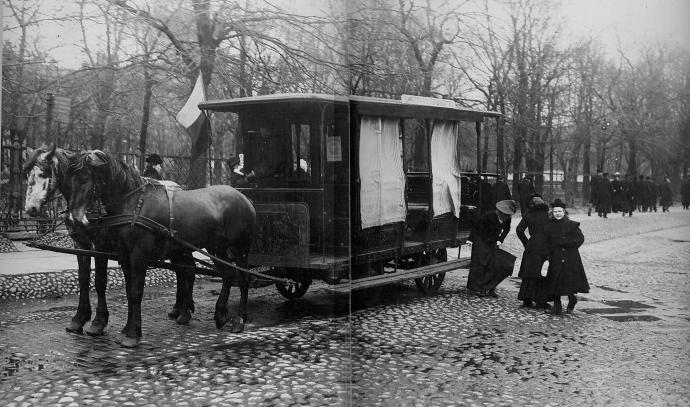
Horse-drawn omnibus in St. Petersburg, 1906

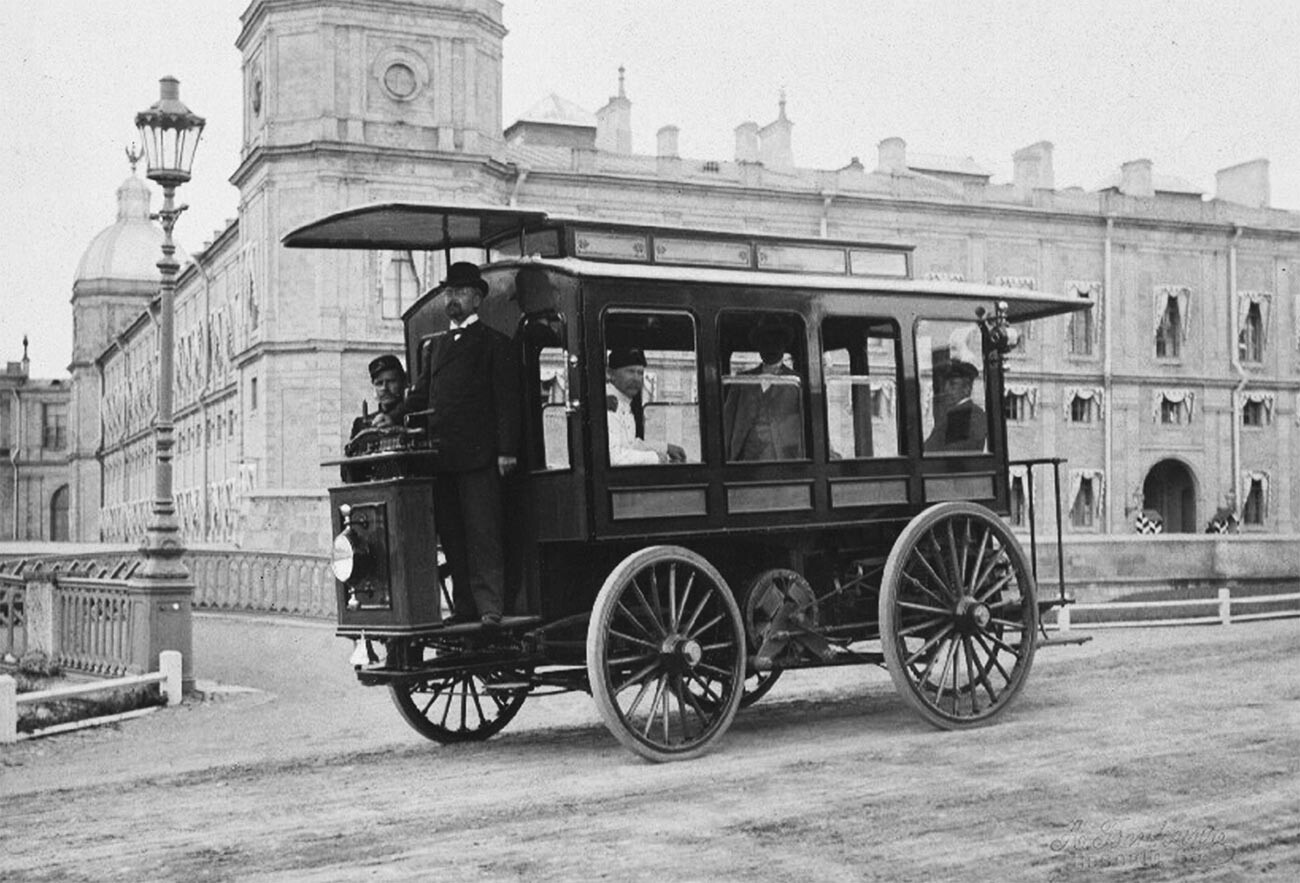
First electrobus, 1900

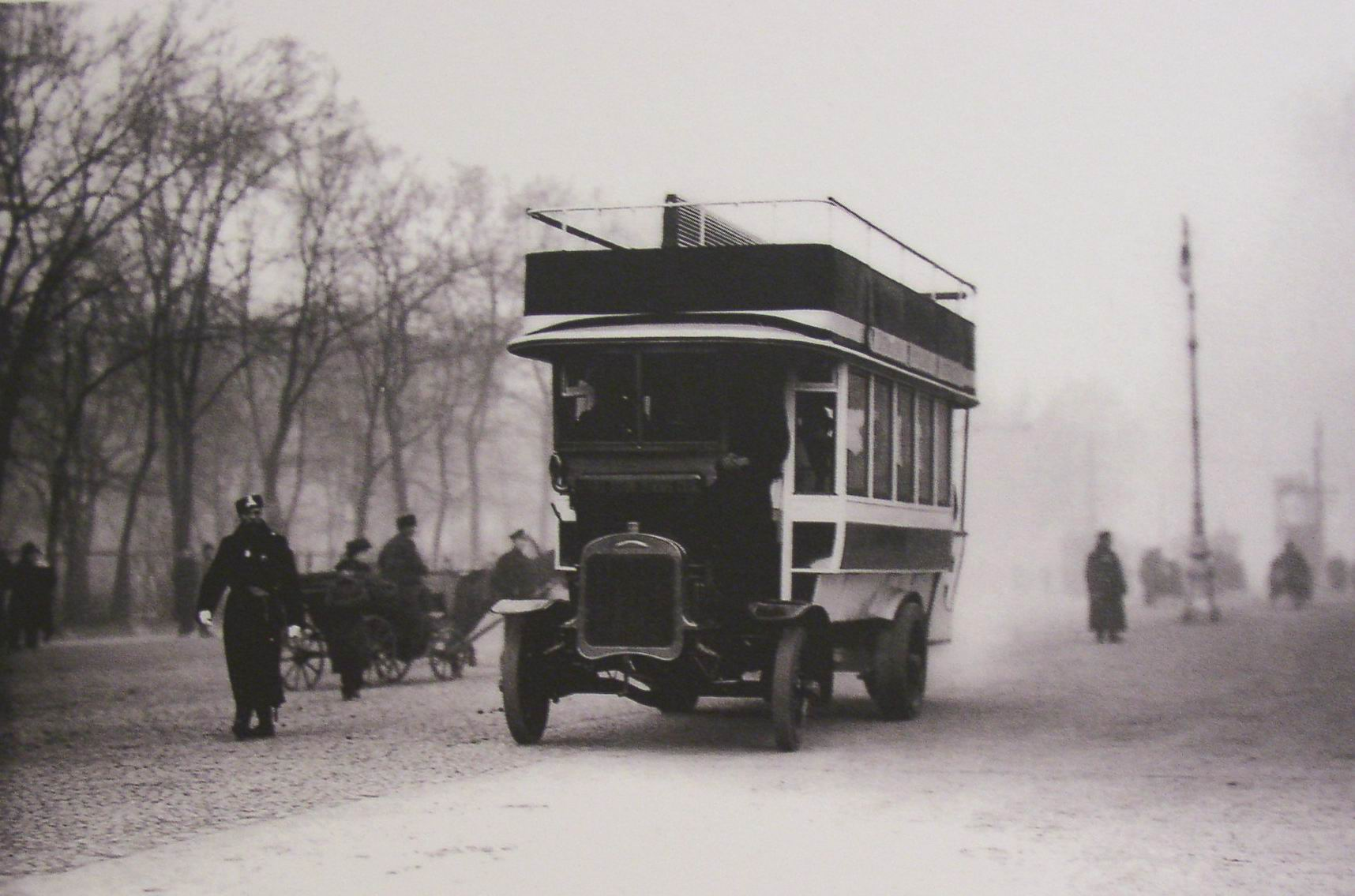
Bus, 1907

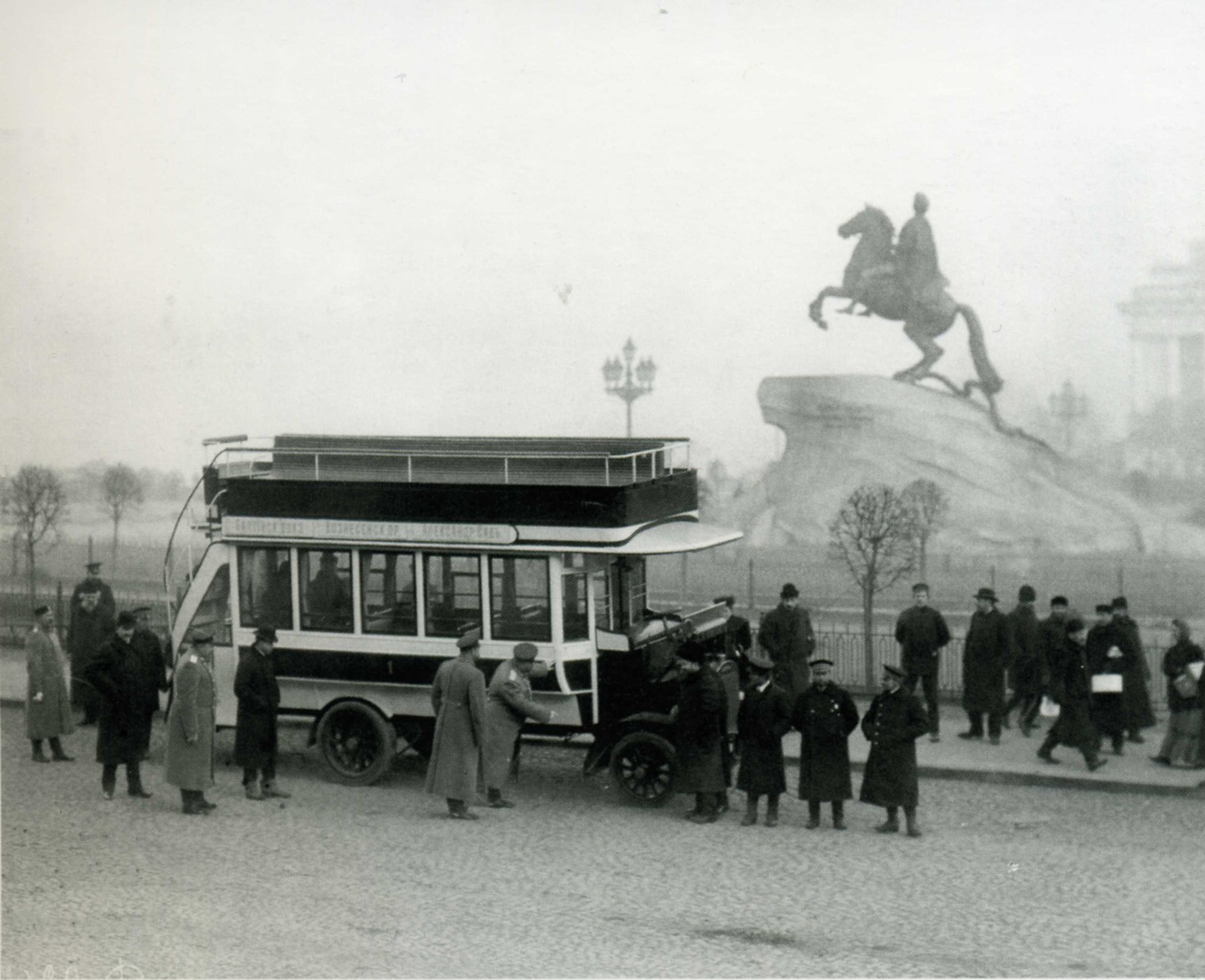
Bus, 1912

=== Rolling stock on Saint Petersburg routes, 1990s–2010s ===
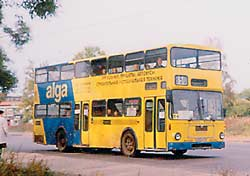
MAN SD200,1998–2002

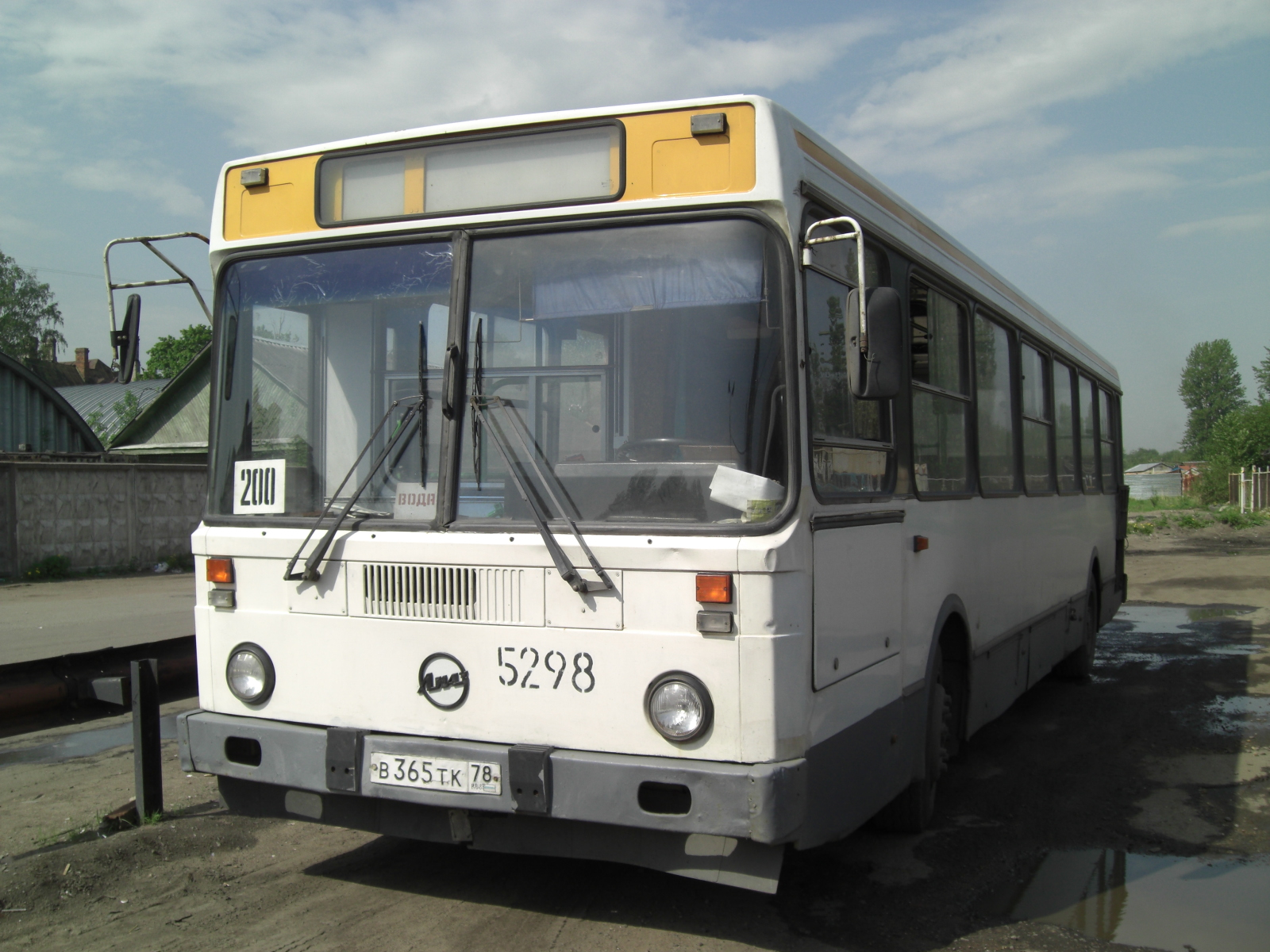
LiAZ-5256.25, 2007

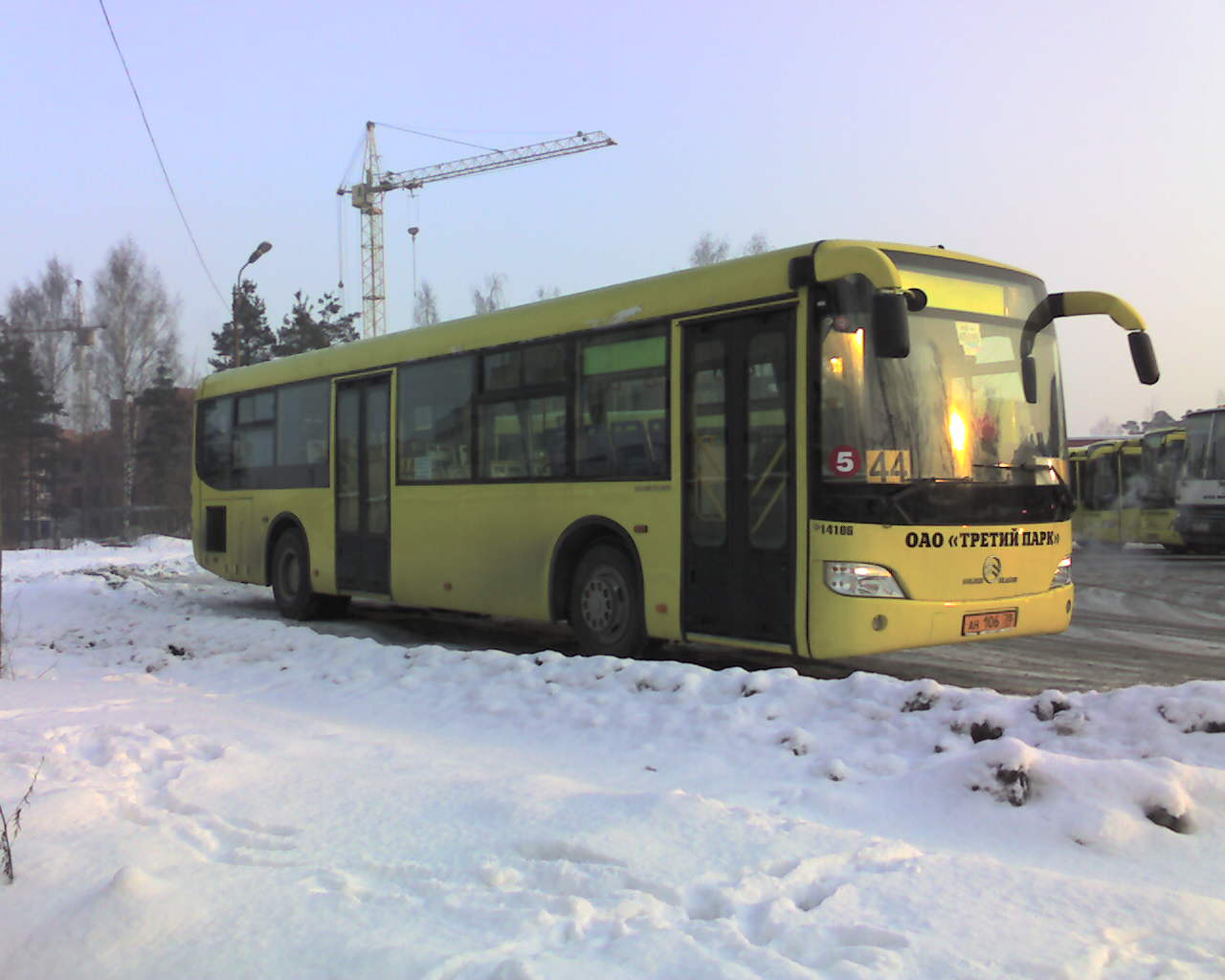
Golden Dragon XML6112 JSC Third Park, 2007

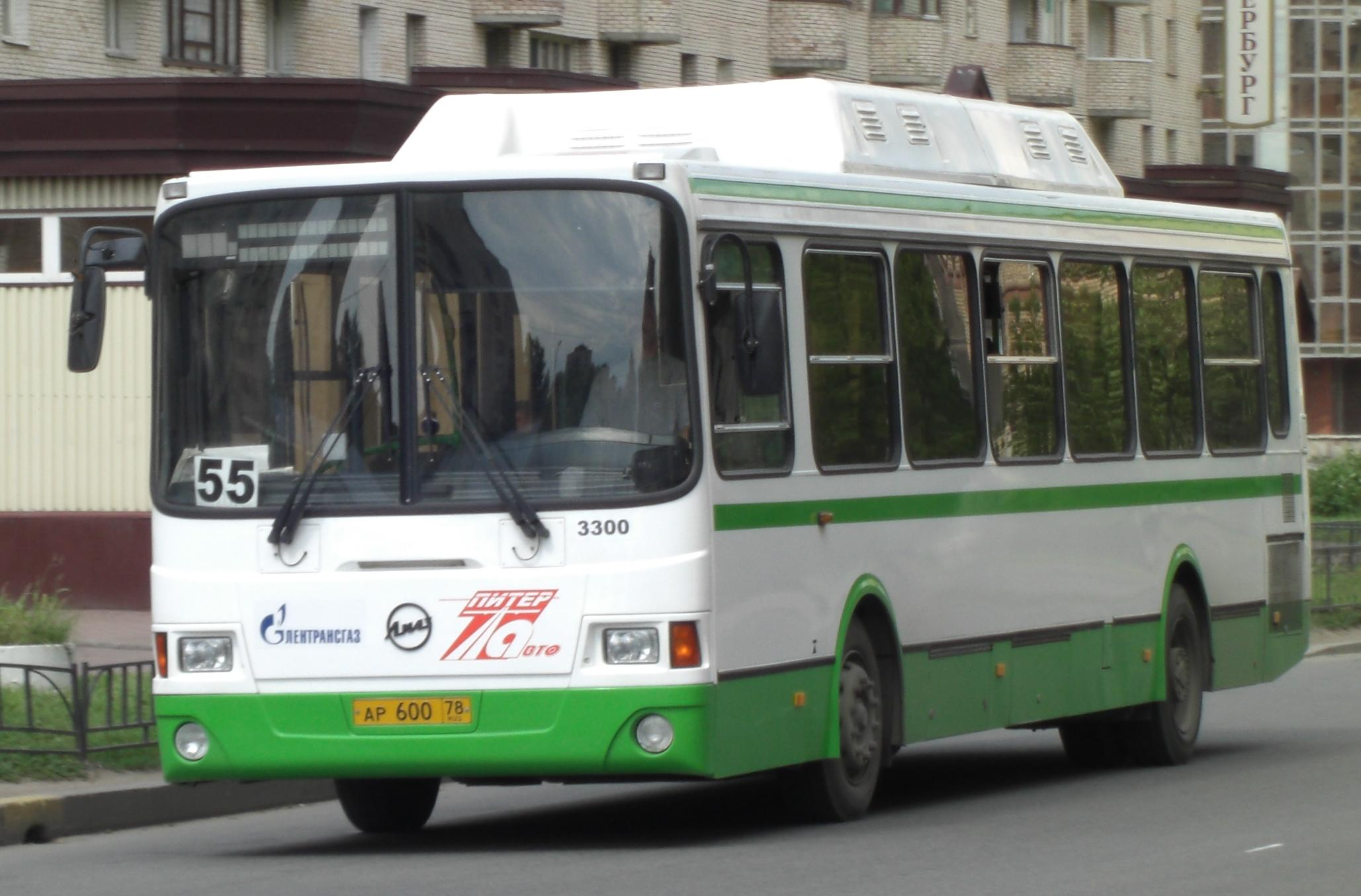
LiAZ-5256.57 CNG LLC Piteravto, 2007

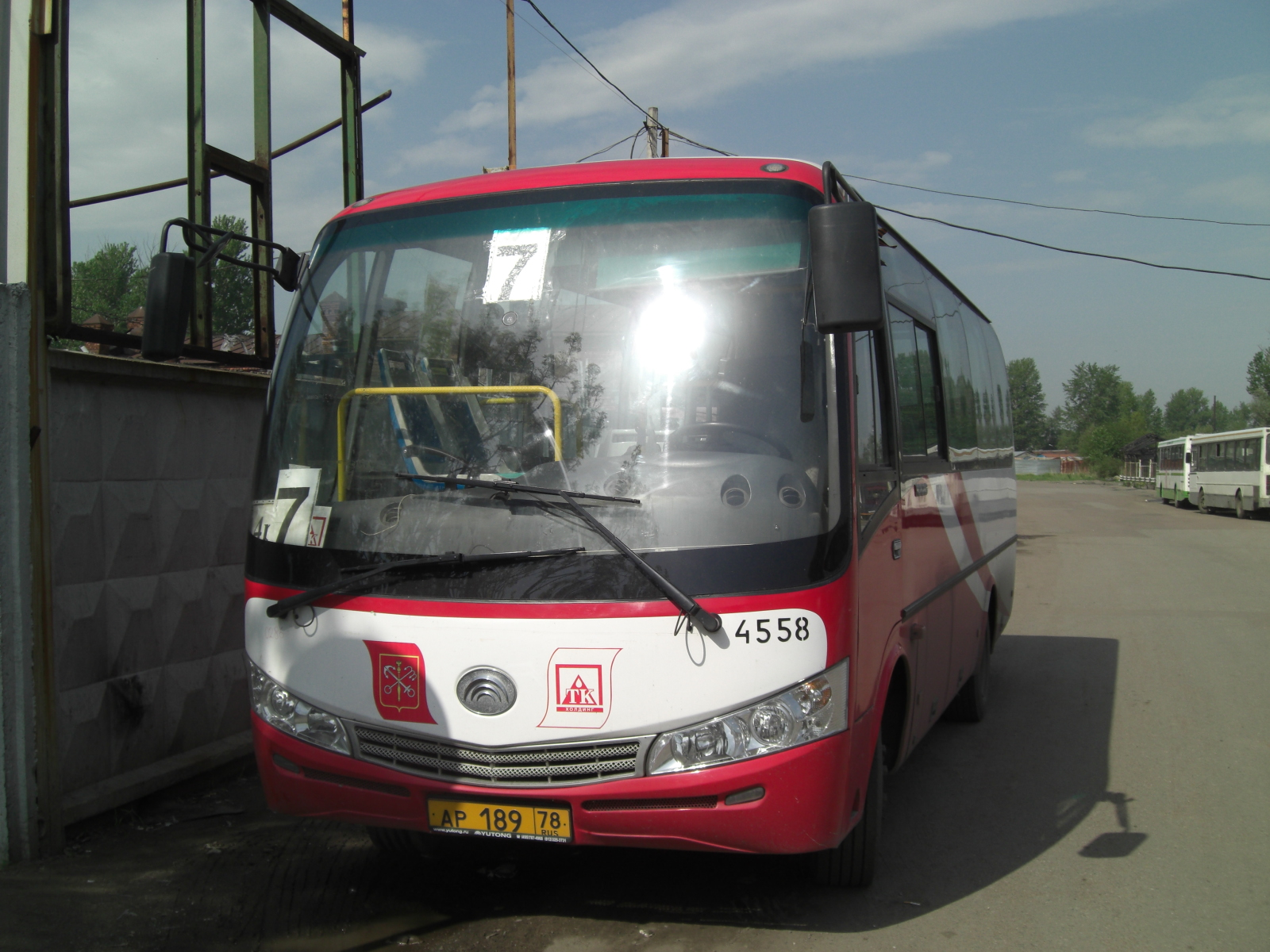
Yutong ZK6737D PTK LLC , 2007

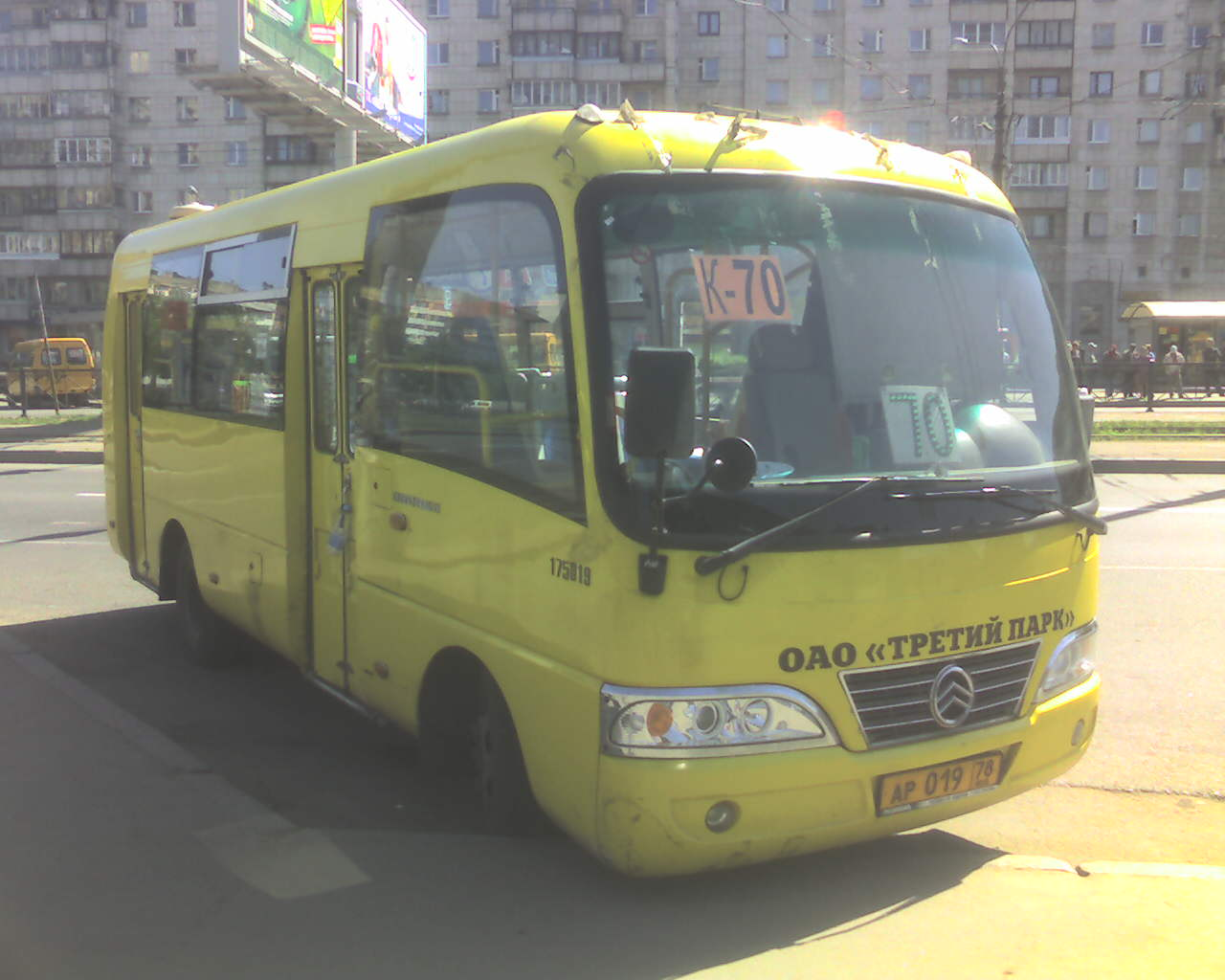
Golden Dragon XML6270C JSC Tretiy Park, 2007

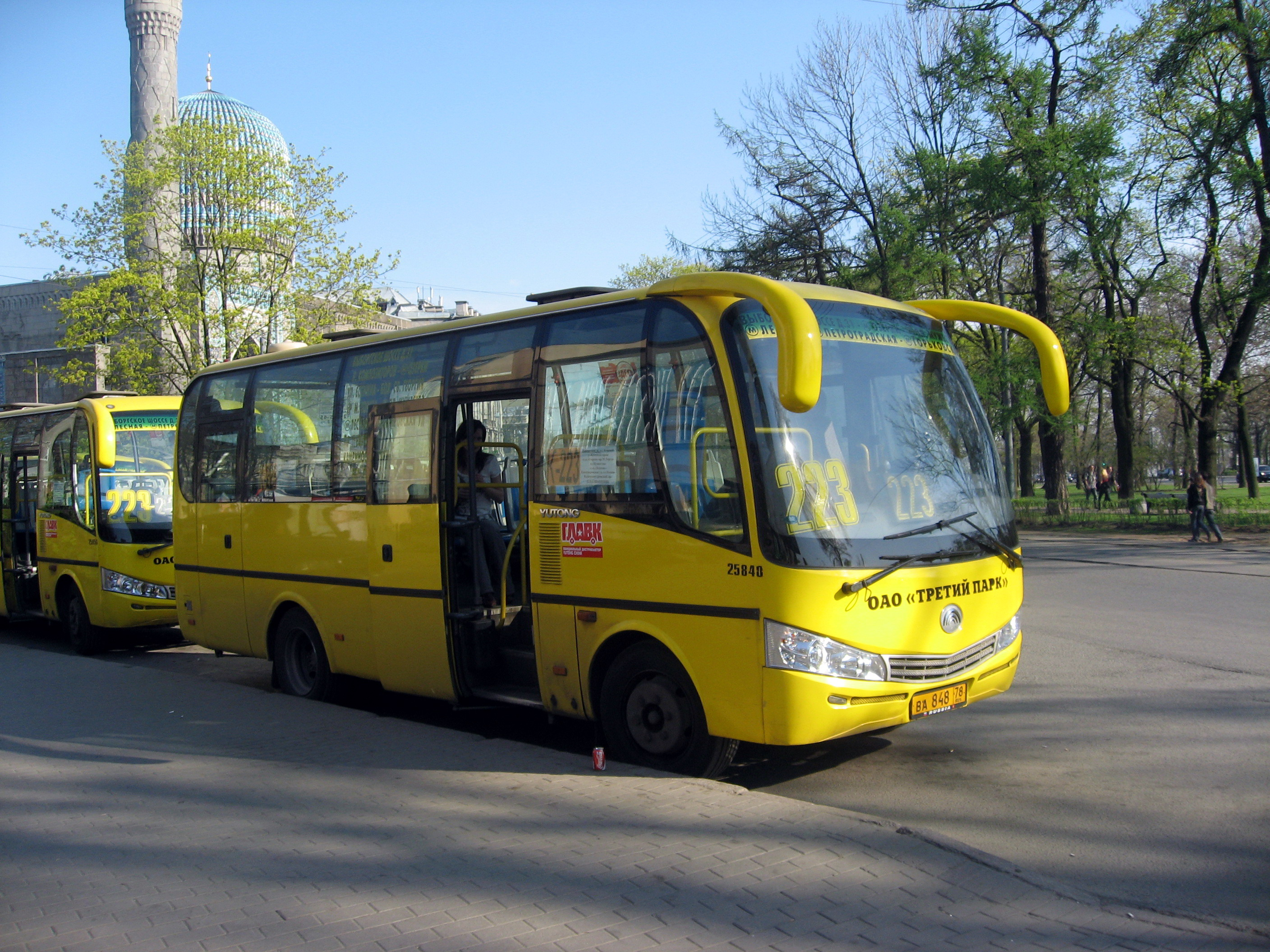
Yutong ZK6737D JSC Third Park, 2008

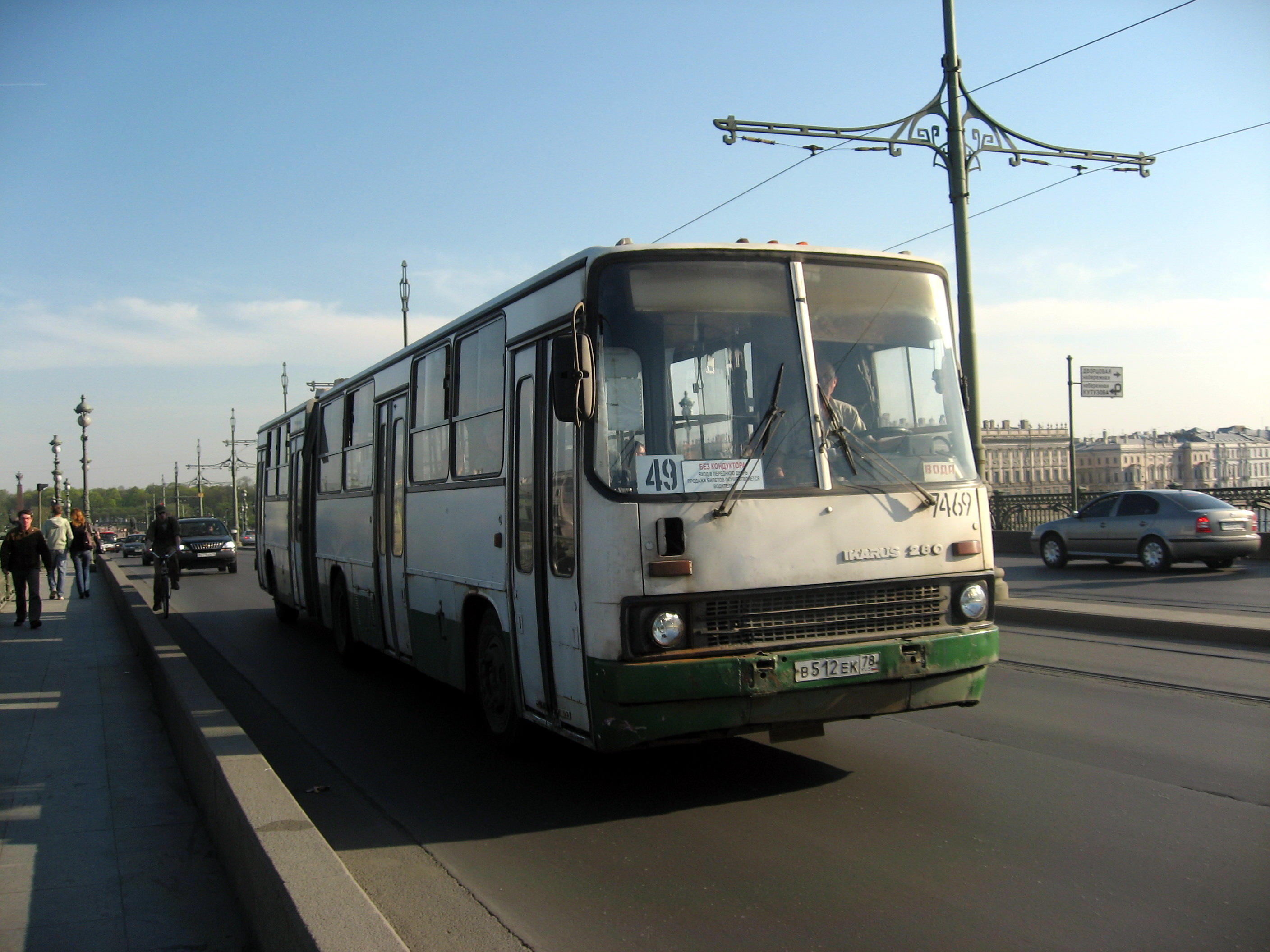
Ikarus 280.33O on Troitsky Bridge, 2008

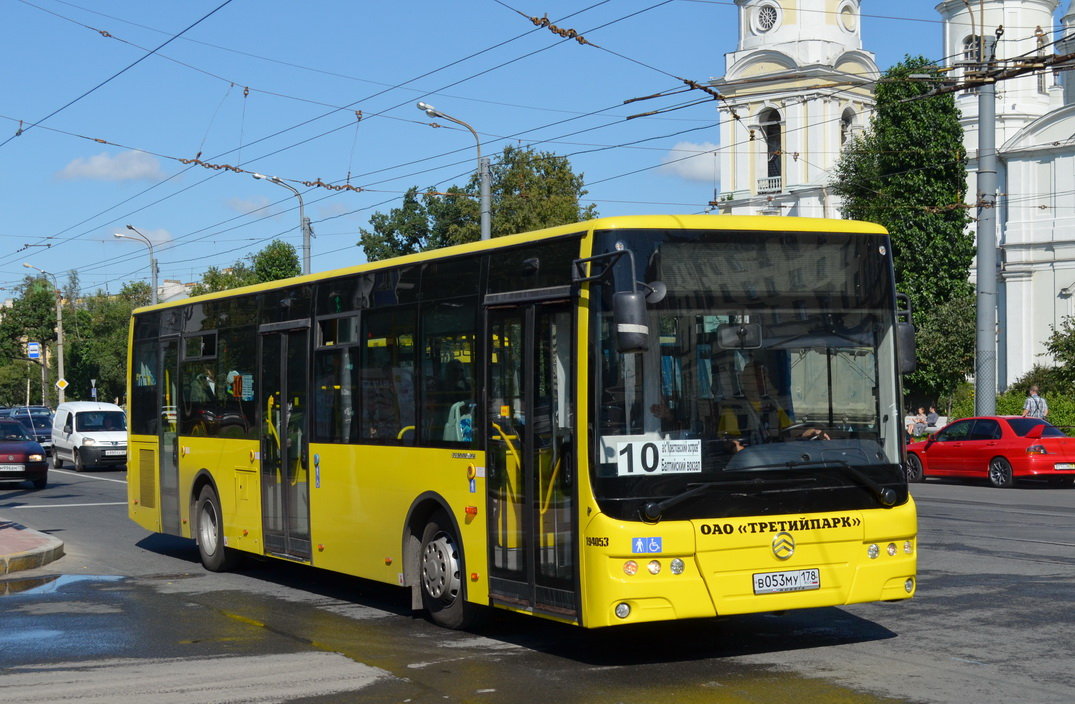
Golden Dragon XML6125CR JSC Third Park, 2012

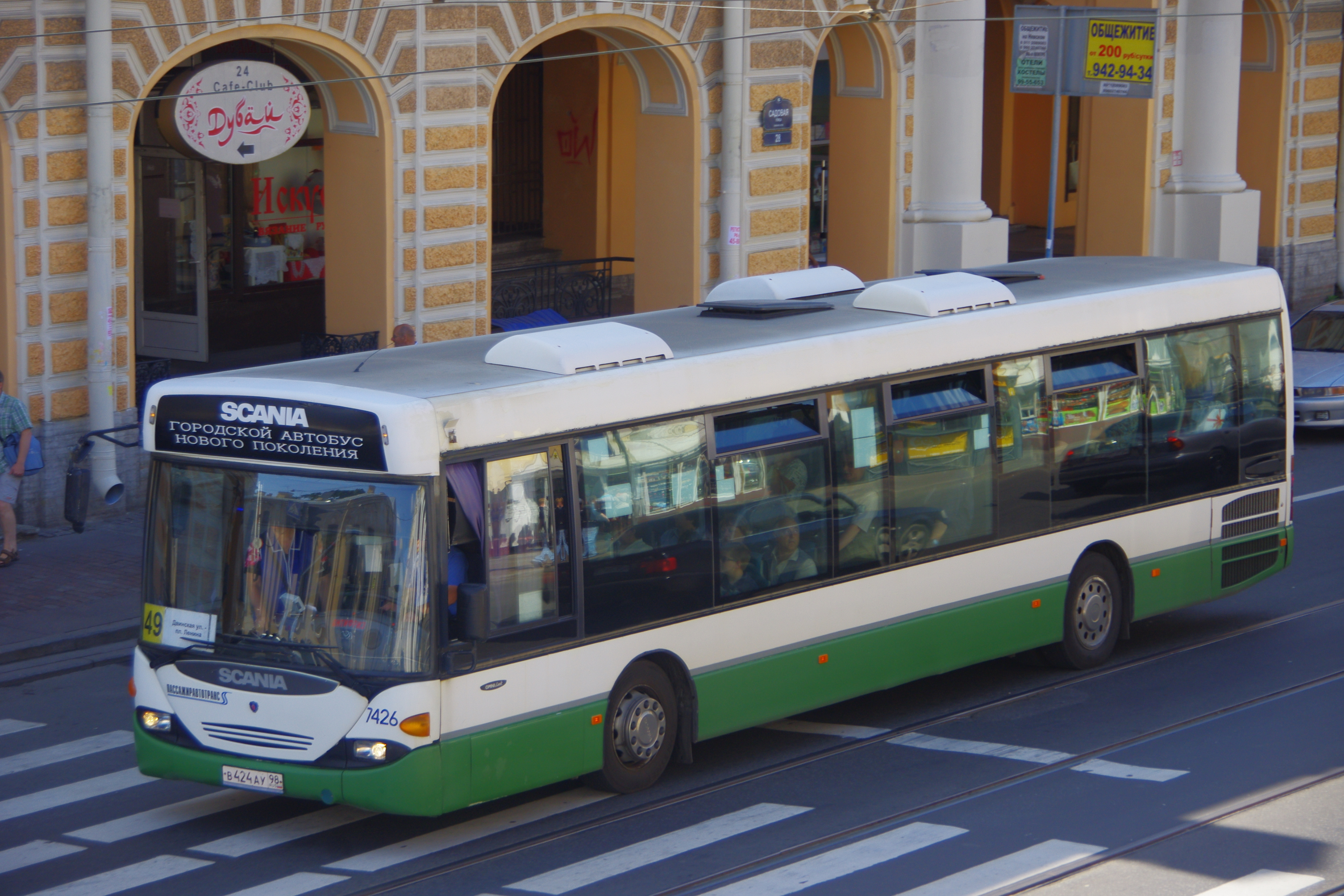
Scania OmniLink of "Passazhiravtotrans", 2013

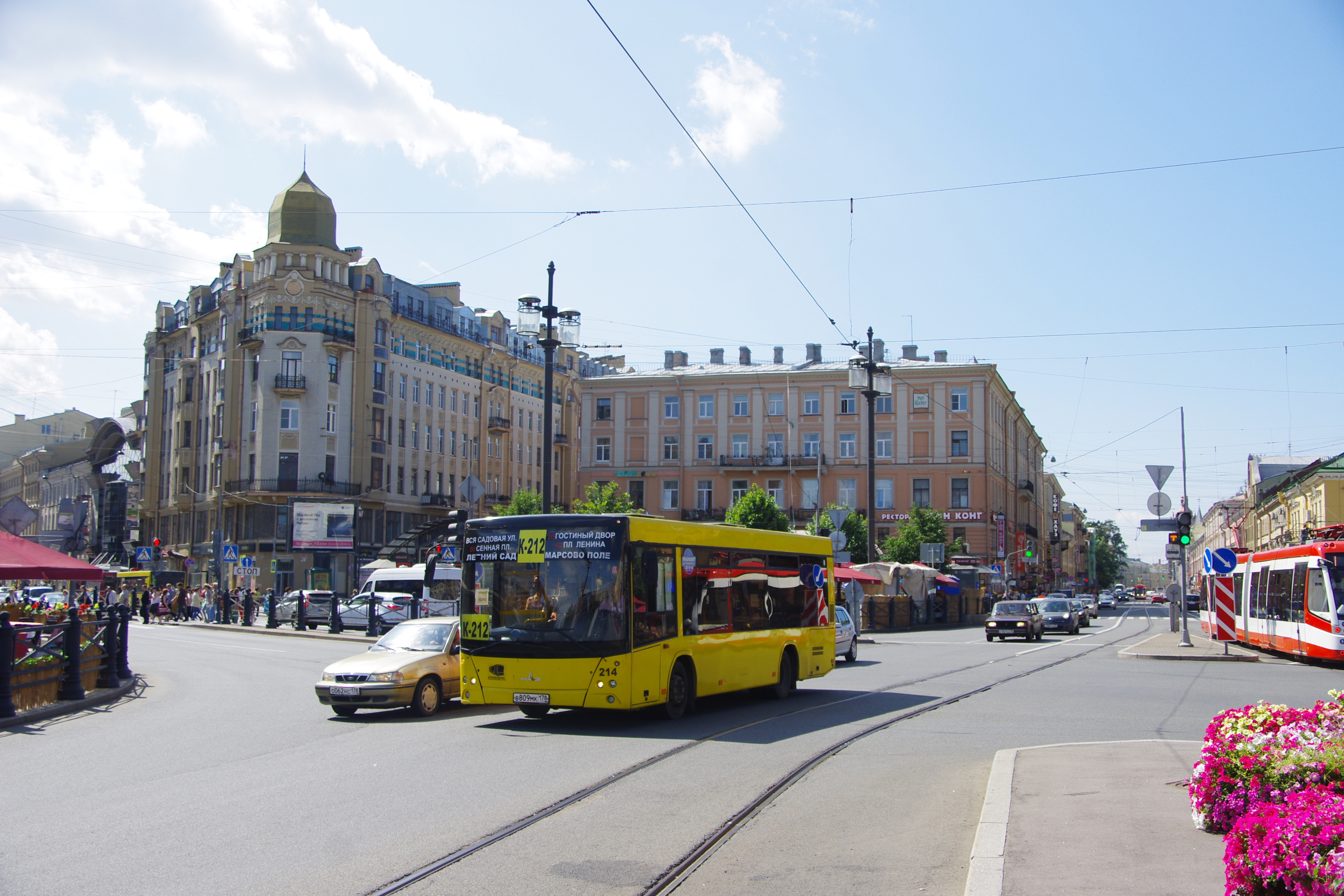
MAZ-206.068, 2013

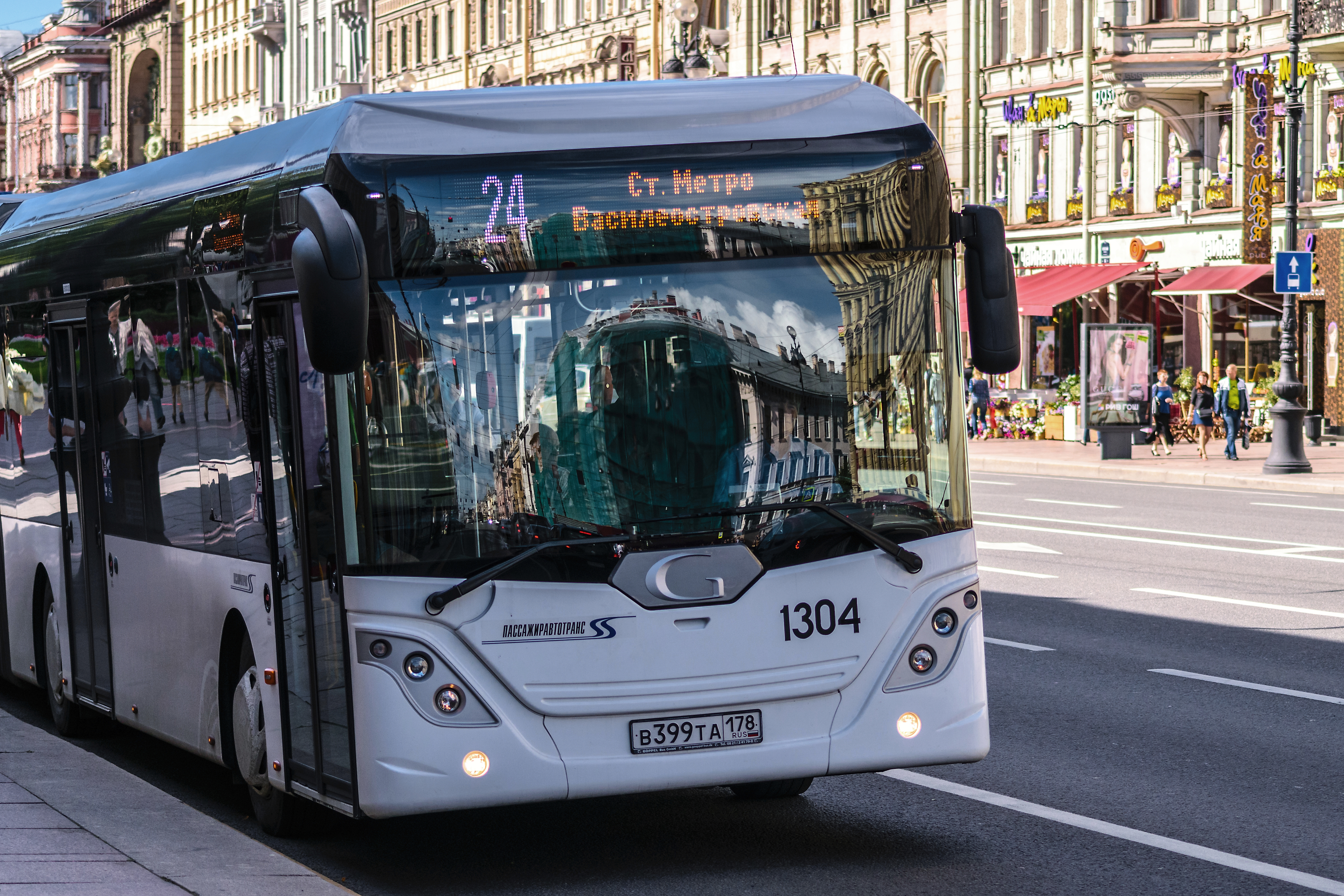
Göppel Go4City 19 of "Passazhiravtotrans" on Nevsky Prospect, 2015

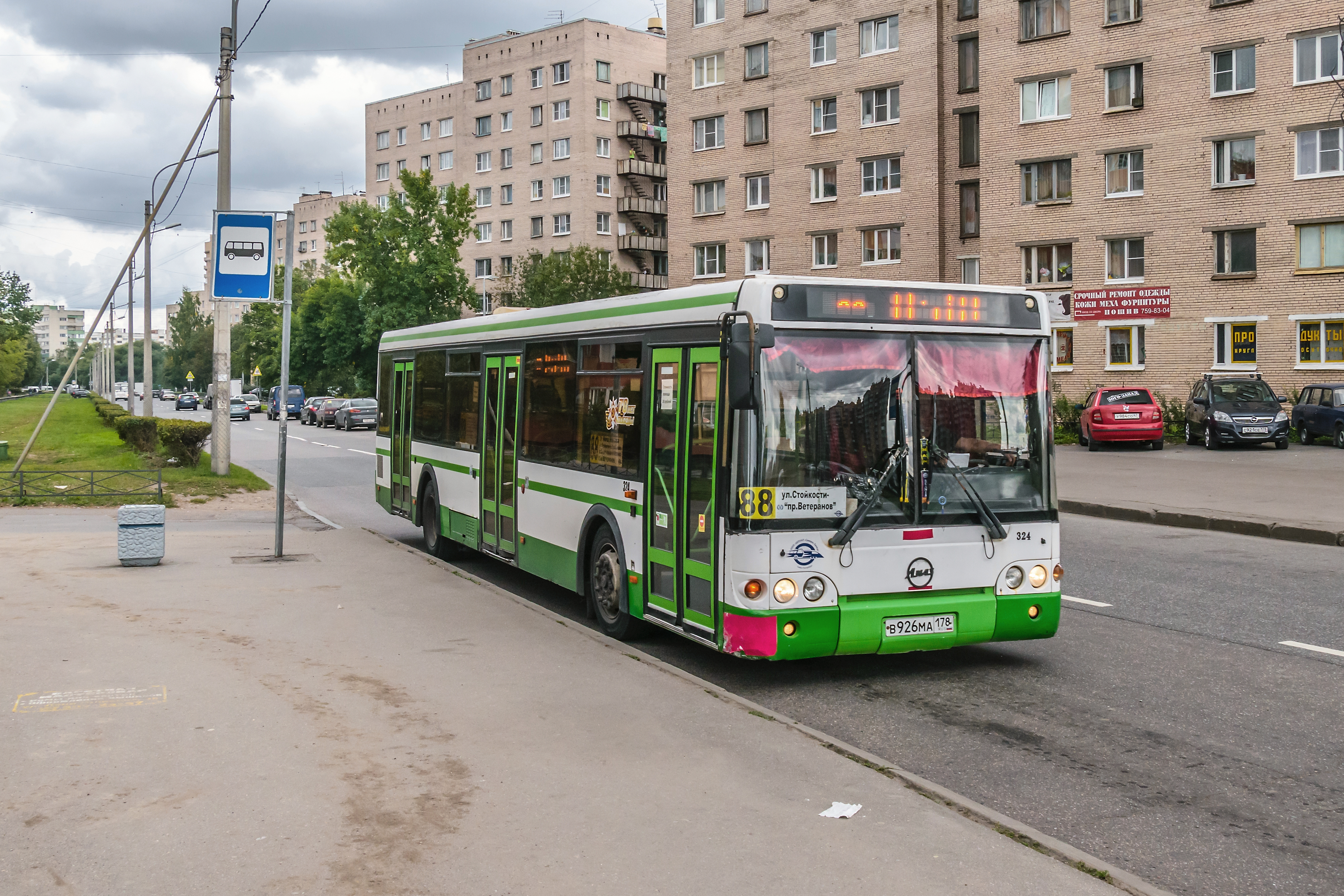
LiAZ-5292.20 of "Shpunt-Severo-Zapad" on Stoikosti Street, 2015

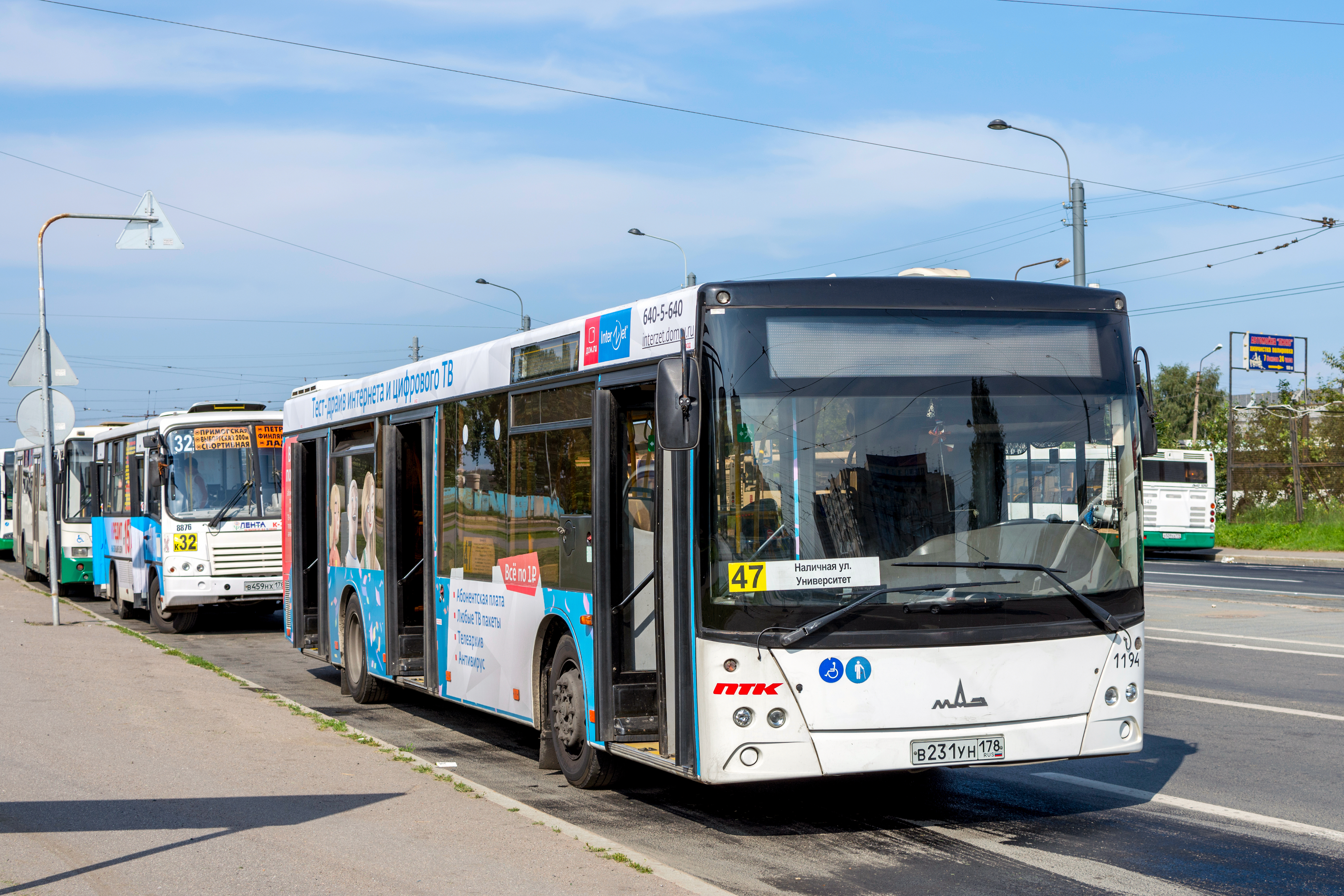
MAZ-203.085 of "PTK", 2016

== See also ==
- Saint Petersburg Metro
- Trams in Saint Petersburg
- Saint Petersburg trolleybus system
