= Vasileostrovsky =

Vasileostrovsky (masculine), Vasileostrovskaya (feminine), or Vasileostrovskoye (neuter) may refer to:

- Vasileostrovsky District, a district of the federal city of St. Petersburg, Russia
- Vasileostrovsky tram depot, the oldest tram depot in St. Petersburg, Russia
- Vasileostrovskaya, a station of the St. Petersburg Metro, St. Petersburg, Russia
