= Museum of Electrical Transport (Saint Petersburg) =

Museum on Vasilyevsky Island, Saint Petersburg, Russia

Coordinates: 59°56′21″N 30°15′35″E

The Museum of Electrical Transport is located on Vasilyevsky Island in Saint Petersburg, Russia.

== History ==
The museum was established in 1967, and is the oldest museum of electrical transport in Russia. It is based at the old Vasileostrovsky tram depot in Saint Petersburg which was built in 1906–1908. To celebrate the 90th anniversary of the St. Petersburg tram, examples of the trams that have been used in St. Petersburg have been restored. There are also static exhibits: archival documents and photos, cards, breadboard models of horsecars and trams, examples of tram worker uniforms, and original cash registers. On 21 May 2011, the museum took part in the Long Night of Museums event for the first time

== Exhibits ==
The museum's collection includes 45 trams and 18 trolleys.

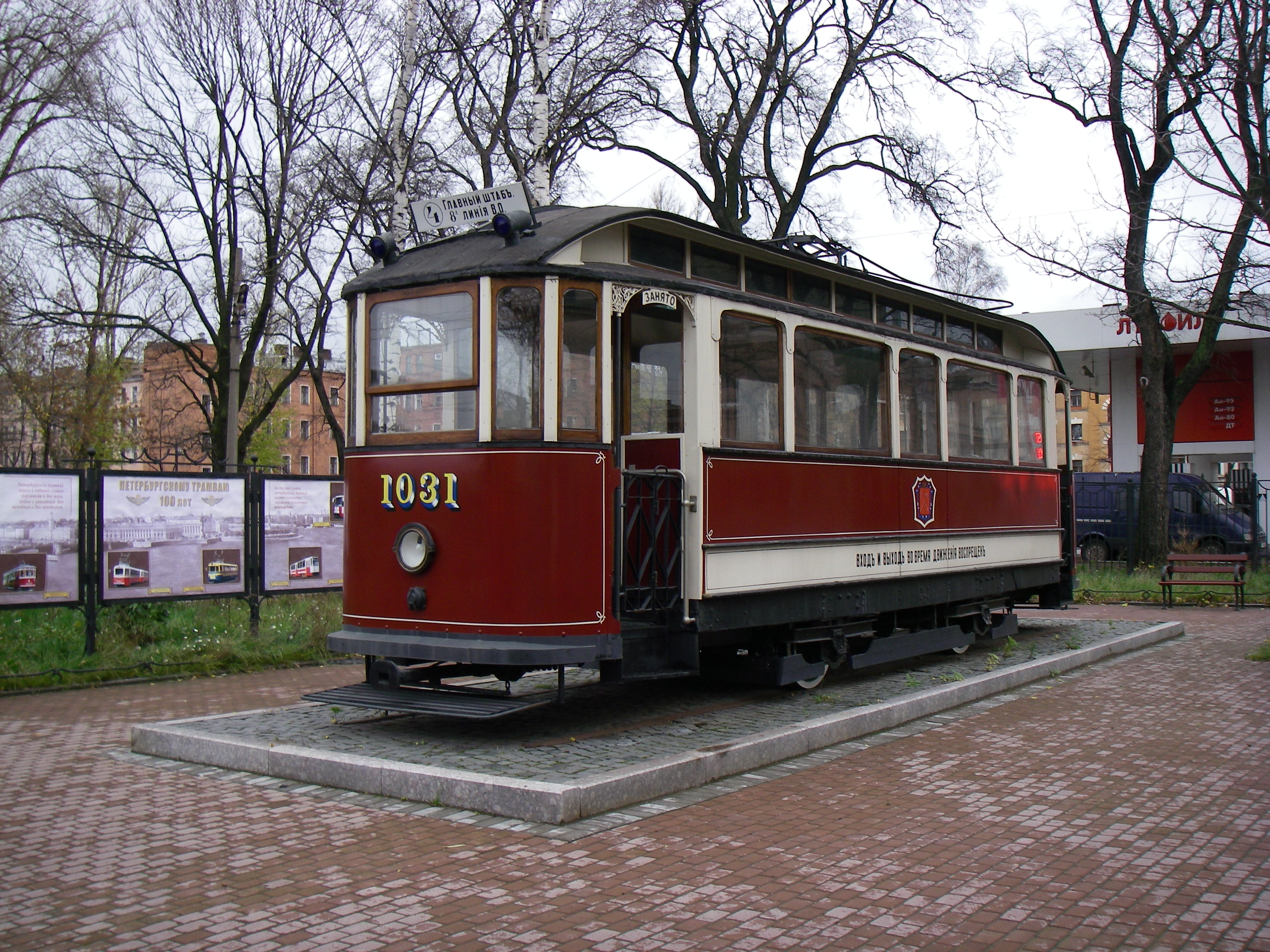
Model "МБ"-vehicle by Brush

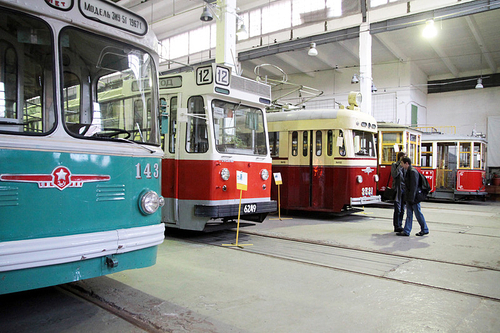
Semished 4

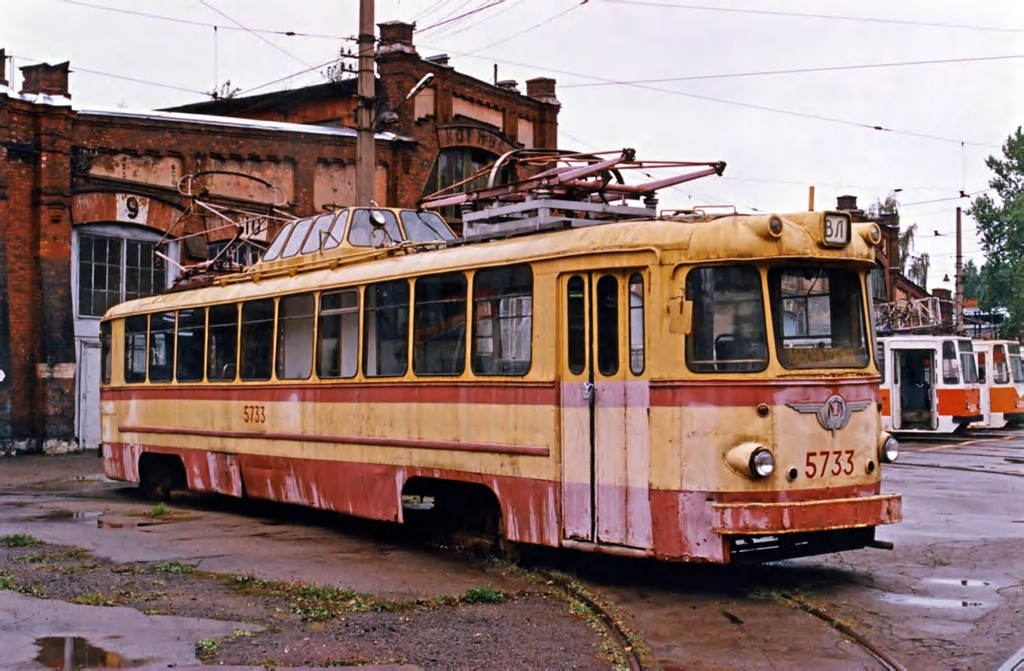
Track-test car LM-57

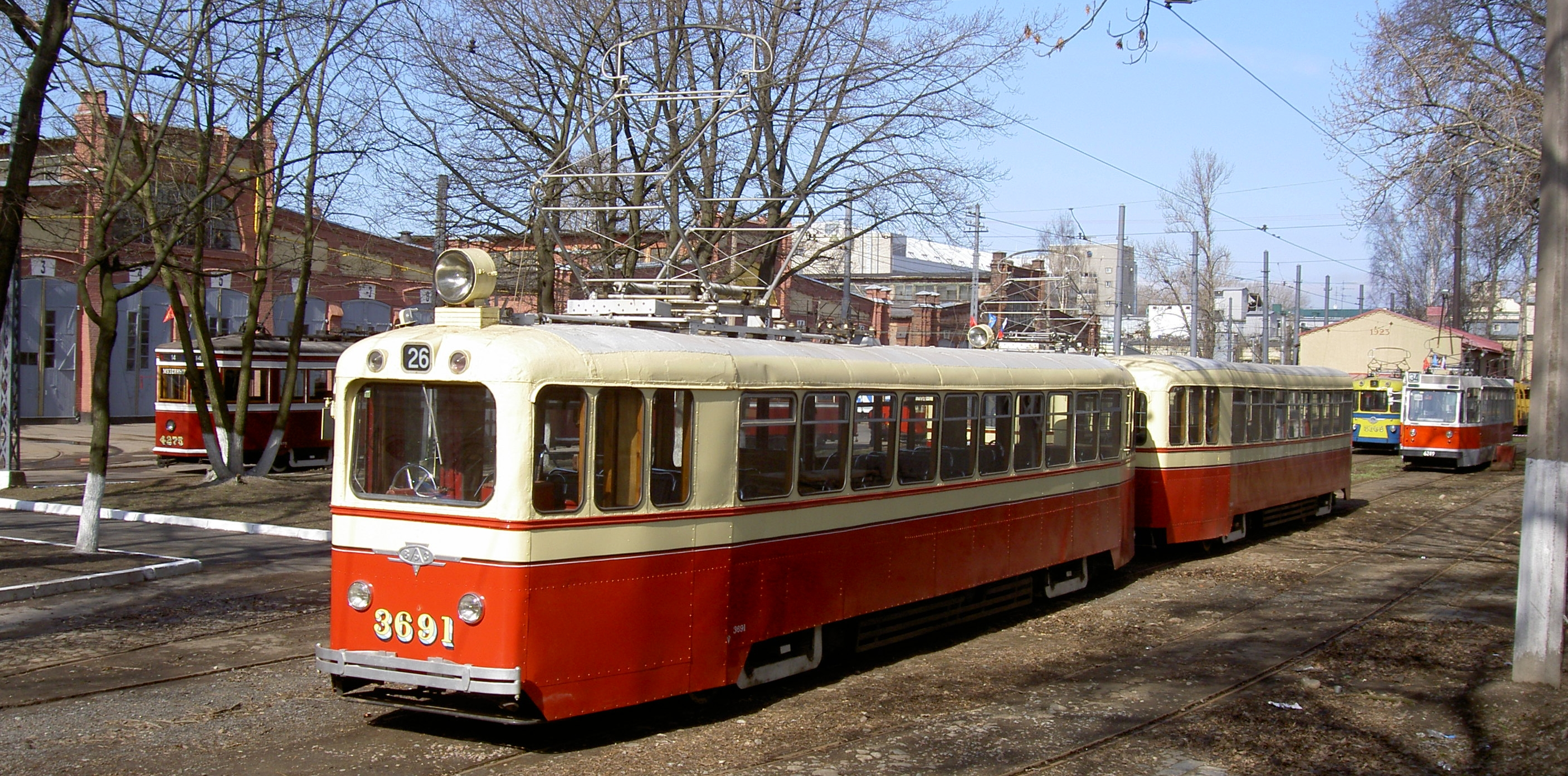
LM-49

== Redevelopment plans ==
There are plans to construct a "Palace of arts" and various commercial ventures on part of the museum's site. The project has caused mass protest from the local community. All models of tramways and trolleybuses are available on the official site of the Centre of events in the Tramways of Saint Petersburg - event-tram.ru

== See also ==
- List of museums in Saint Petersburg
