= Trams in Saint Petersburg =

Tram system in Saint Petersburg, Russia

Saint Petersburg Tramway
- Санкт-петербургский трамвай

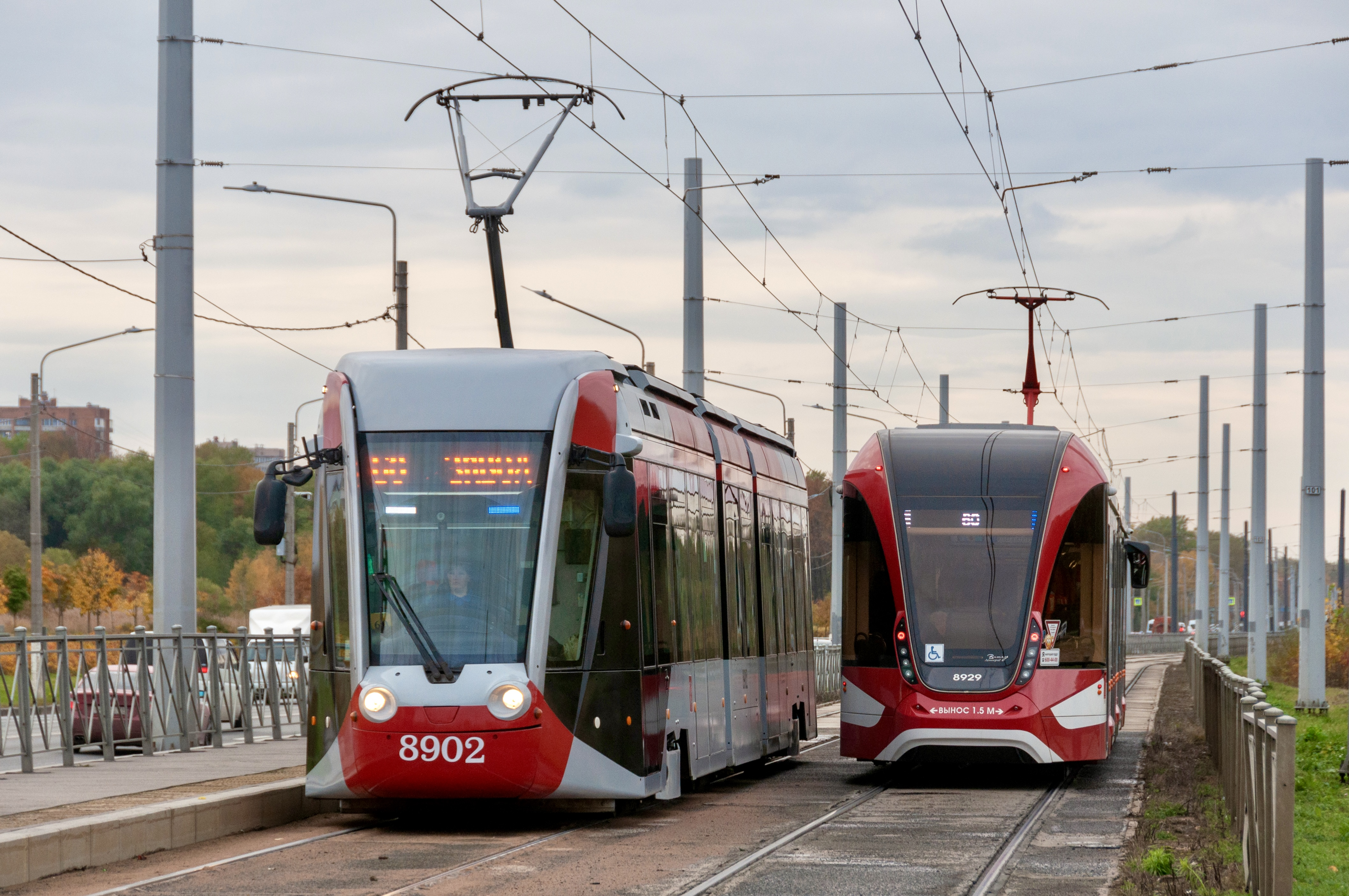

Operation
- Locale: Saint Petersburg, Russia

Statistics
Horsecar era: 1854–1907
- Status: Replaced by electric trams
- Propulsion system: Horses
Electric trams era: 1907–present
- Status: Operational
- Routes: 40
- Operator: Gorelektrotrans
- Track gauge: 1,524 mm (5 ft) (Russian gauge)
- Propulsion system: Electricity
- Electrification: 550 V DC parallel overhead lines
- Track length (total): 231 km (144 mi)
- (System map, December, 2025)
- Website: http://electrotrans.spb.ru/ electrotrans.spb.ru/

Saint Petersburg Tramway (Russian: Санкт-петербургский трамвай, romanized: Sankt-peterburgskiy tramvay) is a tramway network and a major mode of public transit in the city of Saint Petersburg, Russia.

Saint Petersburg once had the largest tram network in the world, consisting of about 340 kilometres (210 mi) of unduplicated track in the late 1980s. However, since 1995 the tramway network has declined sharply in size as major portions of track were removed, particularly in the city centre. Saint Petersburg lost its record to Melbourne, Australia. While it still had 285 kilometres (177 mi) of length in 2002, by early 2007 the tram network's had declined to just over 220 kilometres (140 mi), and by the 2010s operated on just 205.5 kilometres (127.7 mi) of network. Since the mid 2010s, the tram system has experienced a renaissance thanks to the introduction of new rolling stock and public-private partnerships allowing for the development of new lines in the suburbs, as well as the city reactiving some sections in the center.

The system is operated by Gorelektrotrans (Russian: Горэлектротранс), a municipal organization that operates St. Petersburg's 40 tram routes, as well as the city's Saint Petersburg trolleybus system network, and also by the private company TKK that runs the network in the eastern part of the city (green on the map).

== History ==
=== Early days ===
Saint Petersburg saw the arrival of street rail transport during the 1860s in form of horse-drawn rail carriages. The first, freight-only street railway track was opened in 1854 to serve one of the industrial city suburbs. In 1863, three passenger lines in the city centre came into operation. Several private companies were formed, and the horsecar network eventually expanded to 25 routes covering over 100 kilometres of track. Carrying over two million passengers a year, the street rail network in Saint Petersburg proved a successful commercial venture.

The first demonstration of an electric tram in Saint Petersburg occurred on August 22, 1880. Fyodor Pirotsky, an engineer who demonstrated the tram to the public, hoped that the Horsecar Stock Company, which possessed a monopoly on all rail transportation in the city, would consider replacing traditional horse-drawn rail carriages with electric-powered ones. Despite the fact that all tests were successful, Pirotsky's proposal was dismissed on the grounds that equipping existing tram tracks for electric traction and purchasing or building compatible tram vehicles would be too expensive.

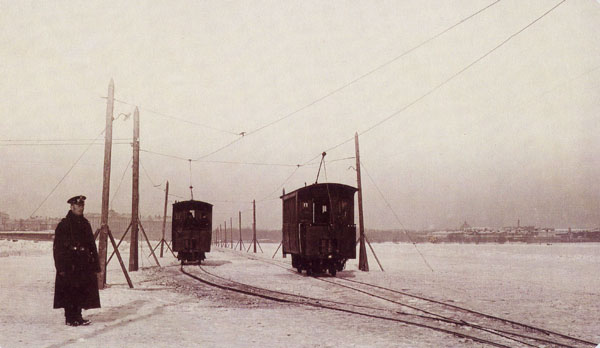
First scheduled tramway service in the city ran on ice covering the Neva river

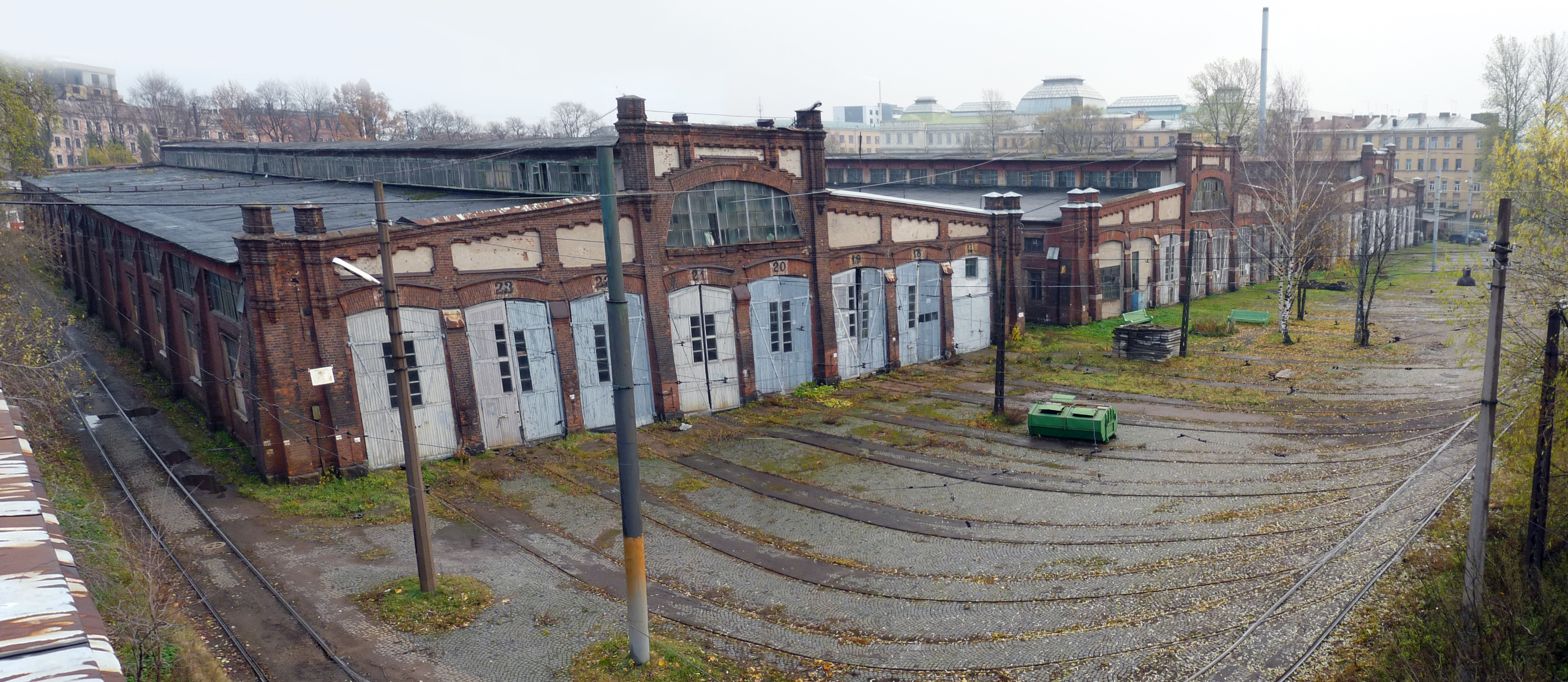
Oldest Vasileostrovsky tram depot and Museum of electrical transport

In the winter of 1894, electric tramways came back to Saint Petersburg. This time, however, they ran on tracks over ice (during winter season) covering the Neva river. An electric public transit company was formed, and several routes crossing the river in various places began regular operation. Even though the Horsecar Stock Company still possessed absolute rights on city street railways, and hence filed a lawsuit against the electric tram operators, it eventually lost the case because the judge claimed that the horsecar company's monopolizing agreement with the city did not cover laying tracks on ice.

=== Beginning of service ===
On September 3, 1902, the contract between the city administration and the horsecar company expired and the entire horsecar street rail system, including track, carriages, horses, maintenance buildings and other equipment, became property of the city of Saint Petersburg - on the condition that the city would pay for the takeover over the period of 12 years. Immediately following this, Saint Petersburg began planning out the future electric tramway network, which was due to replace the ageing horsecar one. A number of issues had to be resolved; in particular, the narrow-gauge horsecar tracks were to be replaced by the heavy rail-grade ones; the network had to be electrified, and new depots suitable for electric trams had to be constructed. The project was delegated to the American Westinghouse Electric Corporation. On September 29, 1907, the electric tramway network opened in Saint Petersburg.

=== World War II and Soviet era ===
During 1918–1921 development of the Petrograd tram network stalled due to the Civil War. In 1921 the tram deal was eventually improved and new lines were constructed. In 1922 the last line was electrified and tram movement was re-established in the old city center. The tram network then further developed as the first automated needles appeared, three tram parks and a few substations were built. Among the passenger lines, the city had cargo and service tram lines; every big company had its branch from the main tram lines. However, from 1936, the development of Leningrad trams practically stopped due to the introduction of the trolleybus.

=== Post-Soviet Era ===
Following the demise of the Soviet Union, the public transportation in Saint Petersburg has been continuously underfunded, resulting in poor maintenance and an unreliable service. A lot of existing tramway track has been demolished, and this trend continues up until today, which upsets both passengers and public transit enthusiasts. There are currently no officially proclaimed plans to abandon the network completely, although mass track removals, which started in 2000, still continue.

On the other hand, two new branch lines were opened in 1999 to connect recent residential developments in the northwest (Dolgoe Ozero, Komendantsky Aerodrom, Lakhtinsky Razliv) to the newly opened Staraya Derevnya station on the Saint Petersburg Metro. Following a change in 'Gorelectrotrans' management in September 2005, more than 20 additional km of unduplicated track was removed, including not only centrally located lines, but also a 3 km section in a suburban residential area. This removal seriously affected the system's logistical capabilities. There is a strong lobby for more removals from the road construction administration, which believes that decreasing tram traffic will give more freedom to automobile traffic.

== Current operations ==
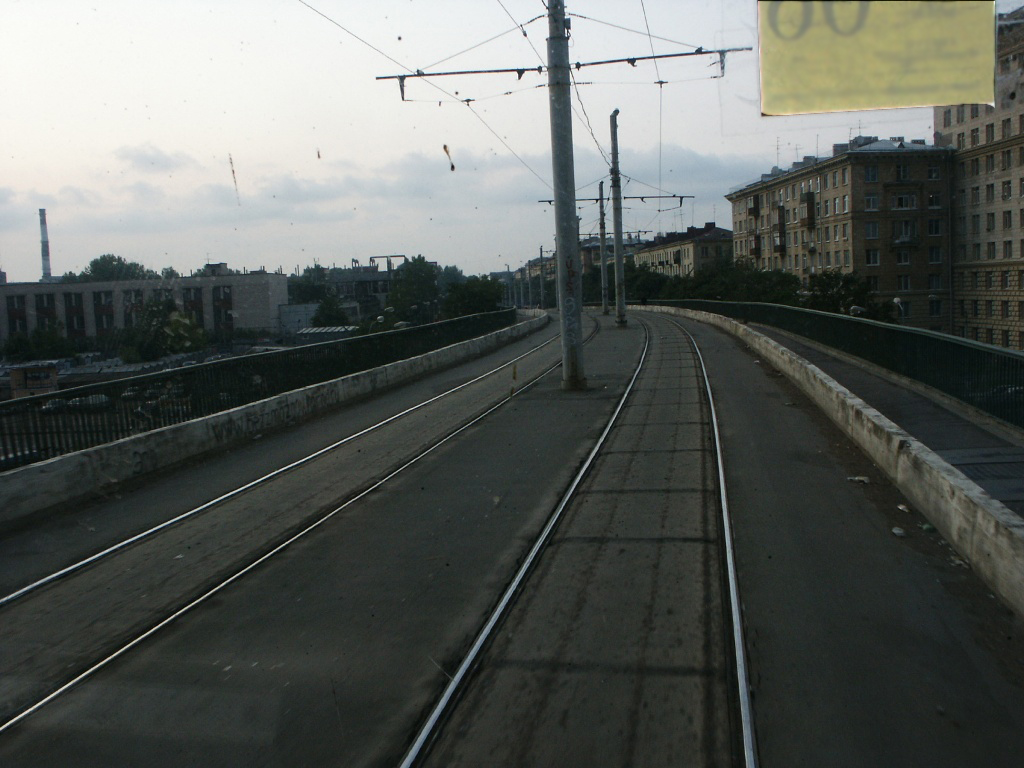
Tram tracks span the viaduct over the Avtovo railway station.

As of 2015, 41 tramway routes currently operate in Saint Petersburg. About one third of the tracks are operated with frequencies of 10 minutes and lower. Other sections are operated with frequencies of up to 30 minutes. The remaining lines through the city center have been more or less abandoned, carrying no passengers. Also, the fleet is still decreasing in size; by the autumn of 2006 there were about 950 cars, operating from 5 depots, most of which were the older four-axle type. About half the fleet is out-of-date, with new cars limited to 30 each year.

== Rolling stock ==
Most of the tramway vehicles currently in use on the network were built locally by the PTMF, which was affiliated with the tramway system. Tram vehicles of the following series are currently in operation:

- LM-68M (ЛМ-68М) — four-axle, three-door single cars, manufactured 1973 through 1988 by PTMF.
- LVS-86 (ЛВС-86) and LVS-86M — six-axle, four-door articulated cars, manufactured 1987–1997 by PTMF. M designates the refurbished, modernized LVS-86 cars in use since 2003.
- LVS-97 (ЛВС-97) — six-axle articulated cars, manufactured by PTMF since 1997.
- LM-99 (ЛМ-99) — four-axle single cars, manufactured by PTMF since 1999.
- LVS-2005 (ЛВС-2005) — six-axle articulated cars, manufactured by PTMF since 2005.
- LM-2008 (ЛМ-2008) — four-axle cars, manufactured by PTMF since 2008.

Former tram models include the LM-33 (ЛМ-33), LM-47 (ЛМ-47), and LM-57 (ЛМ-57). The KTM-5M3 series, which was produced in the town of Ust-Katav in Chelyabinsk Oblast, Russia, was used in Saint Petersburg until 18 September 2007.

PTMF is no longer in business. As a result, the system has since acquired some batches of cars from other builders to determine what will be best for fleet replacement in an ongoing basis.

Between 1907 and late 1960s, the Saint Petersburg tramway network operated British-built Brush tram engines. Several cars of this series, as well as other model types built by PTMF but no longer in operation, are kept in working condition in a museum; all types of cars that ever operated in Saint Petersburg were demonstrated during a parade in 1997, on the occasion of the 90th anniversary of the tramway network. In 2006, a tram route number 0 was operated with museumcars by Retro Tram. The historical rolling stock was stored in the former Depot No. 2 on Vasilyevsky island; however, this depot was closed for passenger services in January 2007.

== Today in the museum ==
Museum offers the exhibition of the retro-transport to visit. Anyone can rent tramway or trolleybus by contacting the partner-company Event-TRAM.ru. They offer organized excursions and private events in different languages.

== See also ==
- LM-49 and LM-57 — trams used to operate in Saint Petersburg in 1960s–1970s
- List of town tramway systems
  - List of town tramway systems in Europe
    - List of town tramway systems in Russia
- List of cities with trolleybuses
- Saint Petersburg Metro
- Trams in Europe
- Buses in Saint Petersburg
