= Vasileostrovsky tram depot =

Tram depot in Saint Petersburg, Russia

Coordinates: 59°56′18″N 30°15′30″E

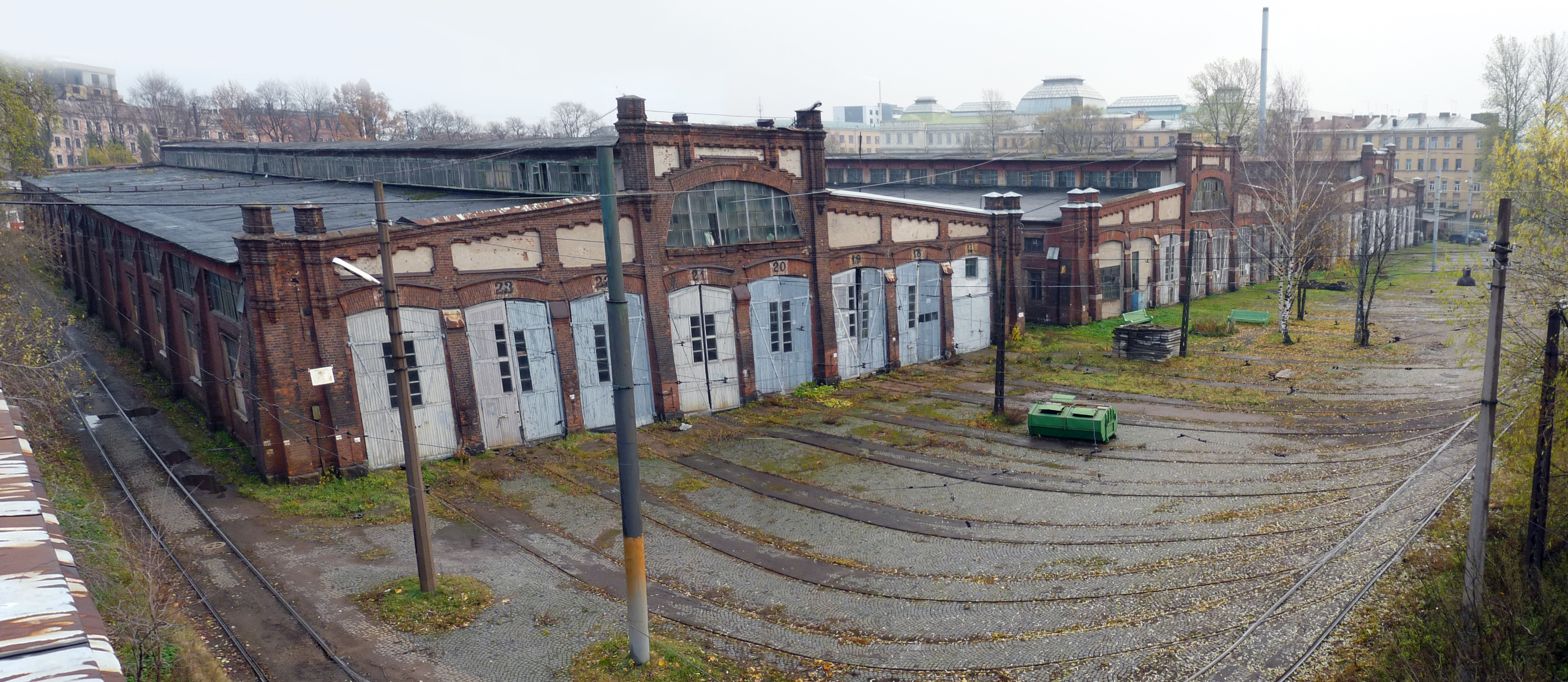
Vasileostrovsky tram depot

Vasileostrovsky tram depot is the oldest tram depot of Saint Petersburg. It was built in 1906 to 1908 by Westinghouse Electric. Vasileostrovsky trampark is a shrine for citizens, because it is associated with the unprecedented feat of Leningrad during World War II against Nazi Germany. Today the Museum of electrical transport is located there.

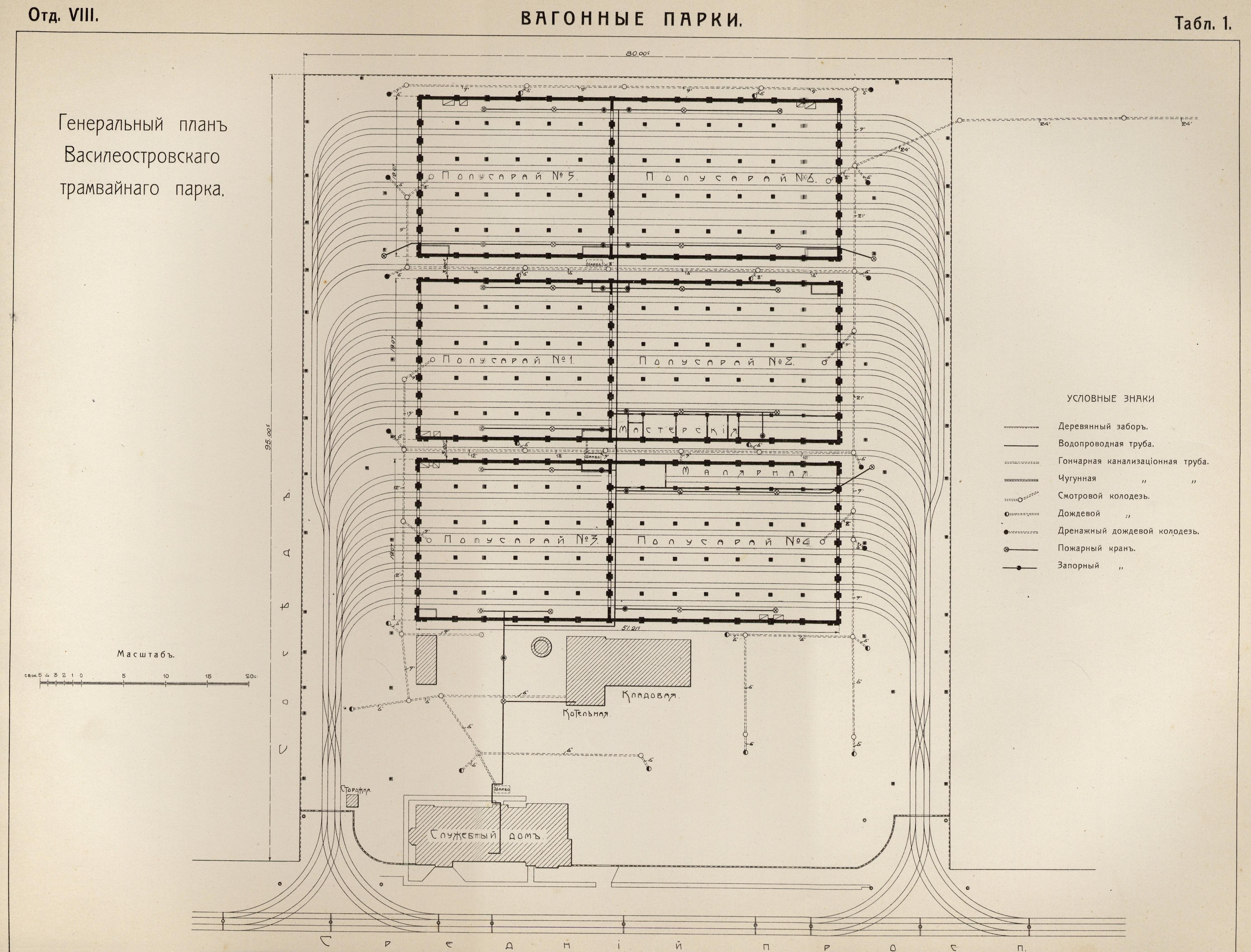
General plan. 1908

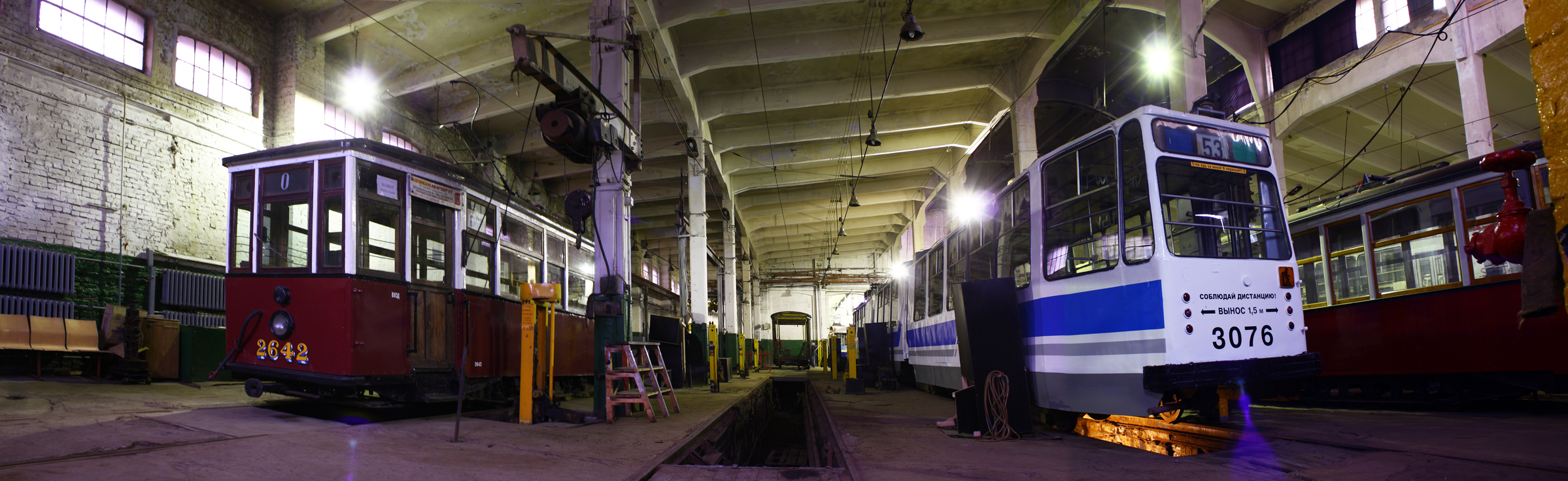
Semished 3 and museum's vehicle

== Design Features ==
The three buildings of the Vasileostrovsky trampark’s depot were built in brick forms of Art Nouveau, they relate to the early models of usage of progressive ferroconcrete and steel constructions. Each of the three buildings of the depot is bisected into the so-called "polusaray" (semi-shed) by a cross main wall with 8 passages. Two residential buildings (built in 1908 and 1915) form the street frontage. Three carload sheds have an internal partition on semisheds. There are various designs of overlappings in each of the semisheds. Semisheds 1 and 2 have a ferroconcrete design of overlappings. Semished 3 has a unique ferroconcrete design of overlappings. Semisheds 4, 5, 6 have a design of overlappings with application of pig-iron beams.

== Threat of loss of part of the site ==
By 2013 it is planned to construct the "Palace of arts" and commercial ventures on a part of the museum's site. The site will accustom by TriGranit. The project has caused the mass protest of townspeople. The preservation of a historical heritage has been fully supported by several institutions and individuals: the director of the State Hermitage Mikhail Piotrovsky, Union of Scientists in St. Petersburg, the Institute of Transport Problems, Society for Protection of Monuments VOOPiK, town-defending community (defenders of architectural heritage).
