= Saint Petersburg Stock Exchange (disambiguation) =

Saint Petersburg Stock Exchange may refer to:

- Saint Petersburg Stock Exchange
- Old Saint Petersburg Stock Exchange and Rostral Columns
- Old Saint Petersburg Stock Exchange
- Saint Petersburg Commodity and Stock Exchange
