= Botik of Peter the Great =

17th-century Russian ceremonial warship

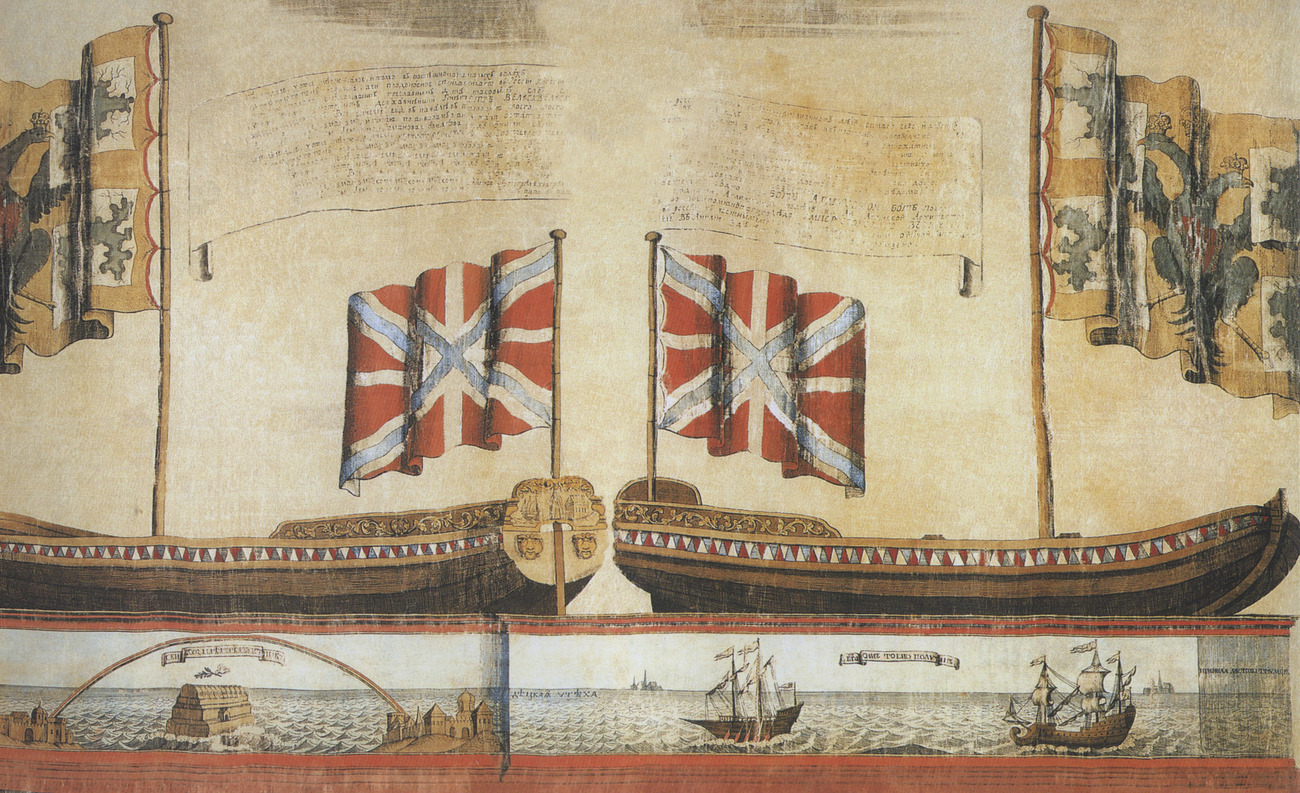
Hand-colored 1722 engraving of a drawing of the boat

The Botik of Peter the Great (also called St. Nicholas) is a miniaturized scaled-down warship discovered by Peter the Great at the royal Izmaylovo Estate in 1688. It was restored by Karshten Brandt, and Peter learned to sail using the boat on waters near Moscow. It was stored in the Kremlin of Moscow by Peter and later enshrined in St. Petersburg. Peter continued to use it in state ceremonies and ordered that the boat be sailed down the Neva River on 30 August of every year. It was used in state ceremonies of later Russian monarchs, including the wedding of Catherine the Great and Peter III of Russia, as well as the centennial celebration of St. Petersburg. Catherine built a boathouse in the 1760s to store it.

The boat became less important under Soviet rule, along with other objects from the Russian Empire; however, patriotism during the outbreak of the Second World War led to a renewal of the importance of Peter the Great and the botik along with him. The boat was moved by the Soviets to the Central Naval Museum where it remains today. In 1997, the boat left Russia for the first time to be displayed at the World Financial Center.

== Construction and design ==
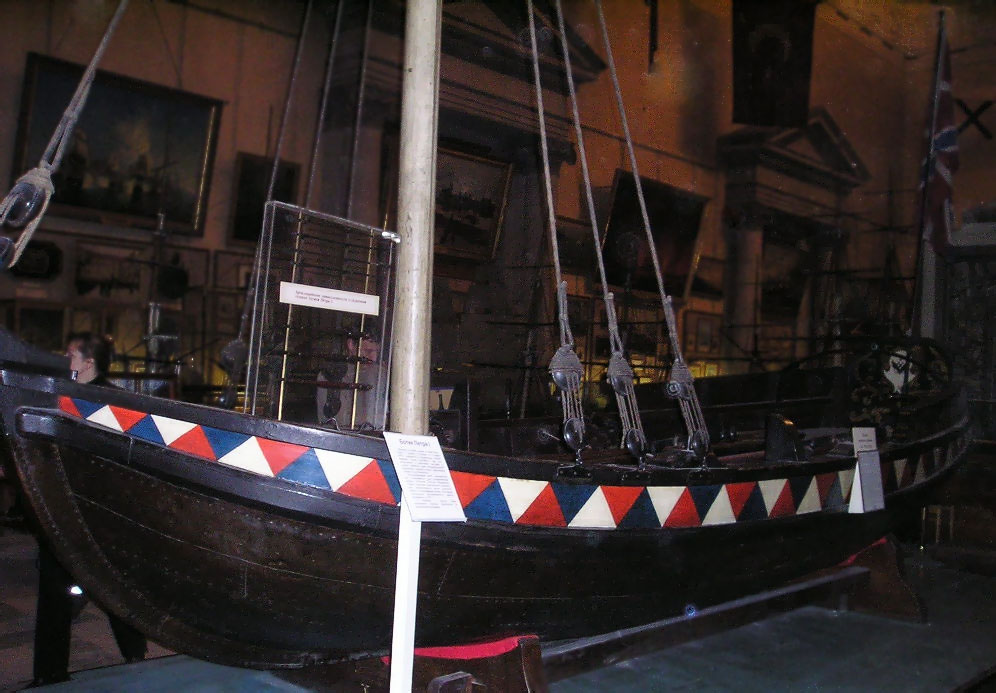
The boat in the Central Naval Museum of St. Petersburg

The botik (small boat) was constructed, either in England or by Danes in Russia using an English design, in the 1640s, and was then called the St. Nicholas. The boat originally belonged to Peter the Great's grandfather; an earlier theory held that the boat was a gift from Queen Elizabeth to Ivan the Terrible in the 1580s. It is the last remnant of the fleet of wooden boats maintained by Peter's father, Alexis; the rest rotted from neglect or were destroyed during the rebellion of Stenka Razin.

The boat has a shallow draft and a single mast; it measures 7 metres (23 ft) by 2 metres (6 ft 7 in). It was steered using a tiller connected to a rudder attached to the sternpost. It also has four miniature cannons. Unlike Russian vessels of the time, the boat was designed with the ability to sail against the wind.

== History ==
=== Discovery ===
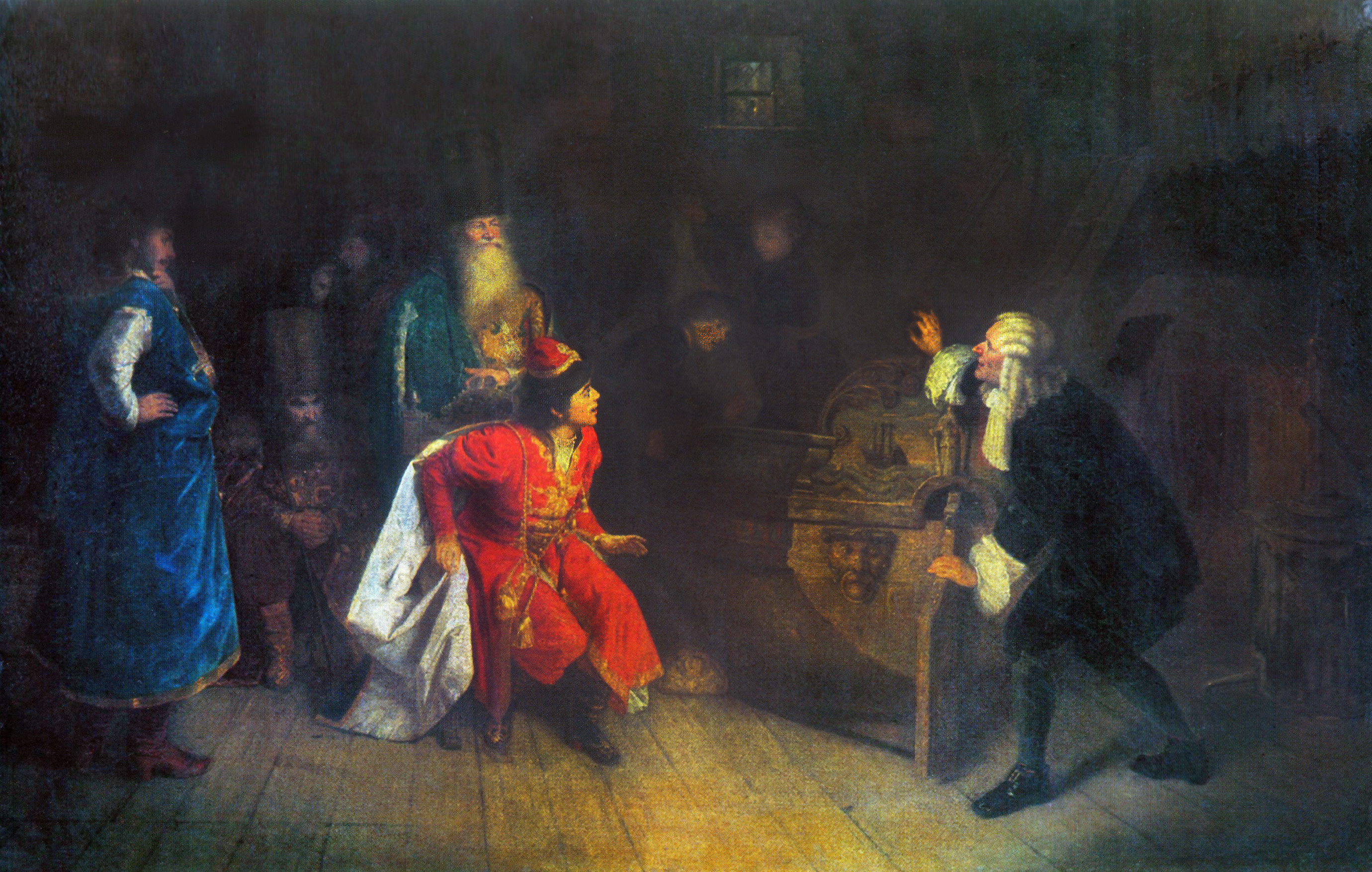
Discovery of the botik by Peter the Great and Franz Timmerman

The boat was rediscovered at the Royal Izmaylovo Estate in 1688 by Peter the Great, then aged about sixteen. The derelict boat was pulled from a pile of debris in either a barn or a storeroom. Peter asked Franz Timmerman, a Dutch seaman, what advantage the newly discovered boat had over Russian boats. Timmerman responded that the boat could sail with or against wind and at Peter's direction sought out another Dutch seaman, Karshten Brandt, to restore it. Peter learned to sail the ship on waters near Moscow.

=== Peter the Great ===
In 1701, Peter had the botik stored in the Kremlin's Dormition Cathedral. Peter referenced the boat in a draft preface to his 1720 Naval Statute. The published preface was written by Archbishop Feofan Prokopovich who wrote that "the botik served him not only as a childhood pastime, but became the cause of his building a navy, as we now see with wonder" and illustrated this with the metaphor, "great oaks from little acorns grow". In September of the same year, Prokopovich gave a "Sermon in Praise of the Russian Fleet" where he stated that the boat was "to the navy what the seed is to the tree" and that the boat was "worthy of being clad in gold".

Peter the Great ordered that the boat be displayed in the Kremlin in 1722 in honor of the Peace of Nystad. His botik was placed outside the Dormition Cathedral, Moscow. It was moved from there to the Alexander Nevsky Monastery in May 1723. Peter sailed the boat down the Neva River on his birthday, 30 May 1723, along with a convoy of yachts and other ships of the Admiralty. In August of the same year, Peter sailed the boat in a regatta of the Baltic Fleet from St. Petersburg to Kronshtadt. The boat was placed in the kronverk of the Peter and Paul Fortress on a plinth, inscribed with the words "From the amusement of the child came the triumph of the man". After the boat took part in ceremonies on the third anniversary of the Peace of Nystad, 30 August 1724, Peter ordered that it be sailed or rowed to the Alexander Nevsky Monastery every year on 30 August.

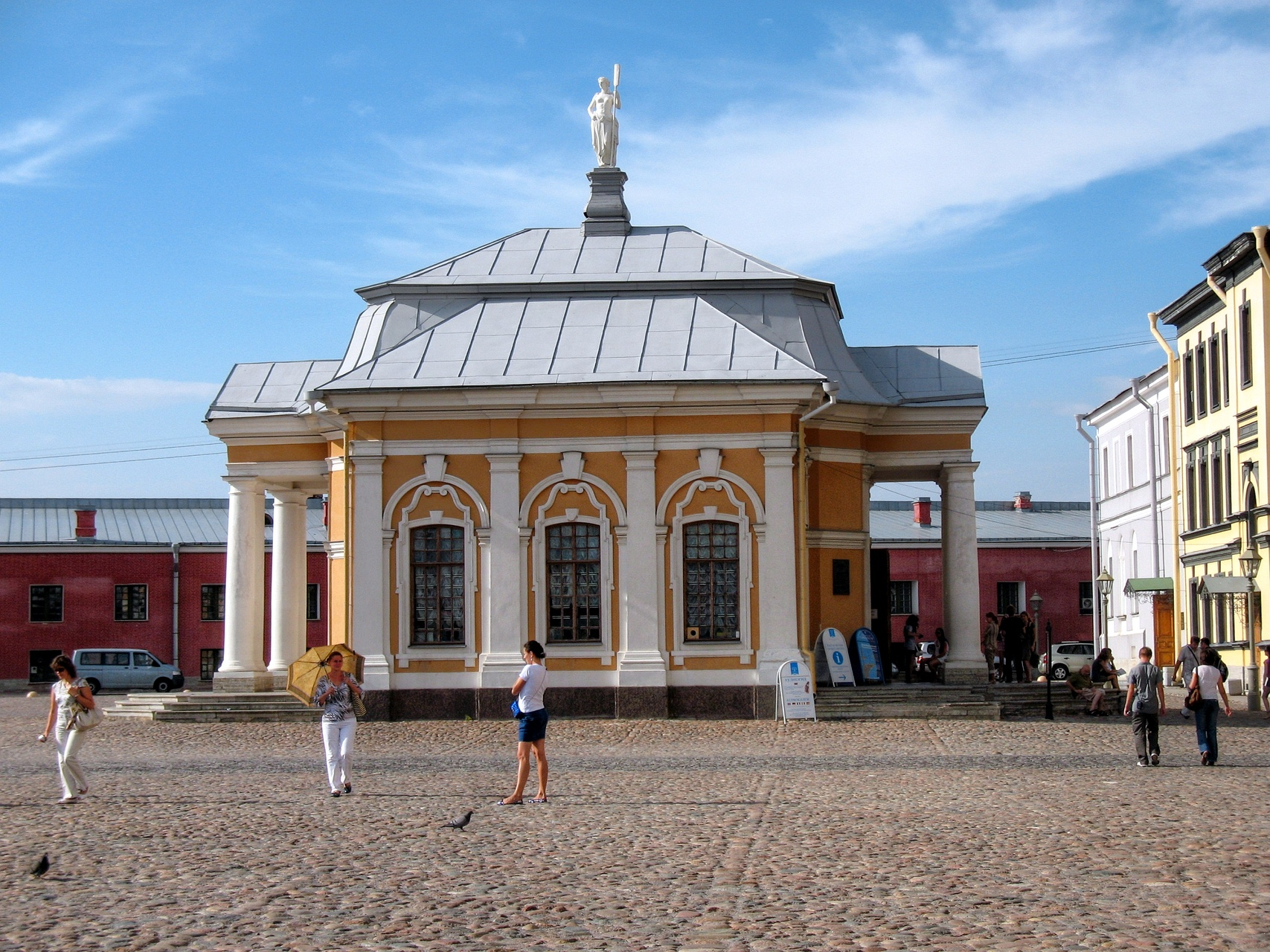
Boathouse built by Catherine the Great

=== Later Russian monarchs ===
The botik was used in many state ceremonies by later Russian monarchies. The boat appeared in a regatta during the 1745 wedding of Peter III of Russia and Catherine the Great. Wearing naval uniform, Empress Elizabeth escorted the botik. Catherine had a boathouse built inside the fortress to house the botik in the 1760s. The boathouse became a major tourist attraction. In 1803, during the centennial celebration of St. Petersburg under Alexander I, the boat was featured in a flotilla on the Neva; it was referred to as the "grandfather of the Russian navy" a name originally given to it by Peter I.

In 1872, the boat was brought to Moscow in a cortege led by a brother of Alexander II of Russia for the bicentennial celebration of Peter's birth. It was received by a 101-gun salute and displayed in the great Moscow fair.

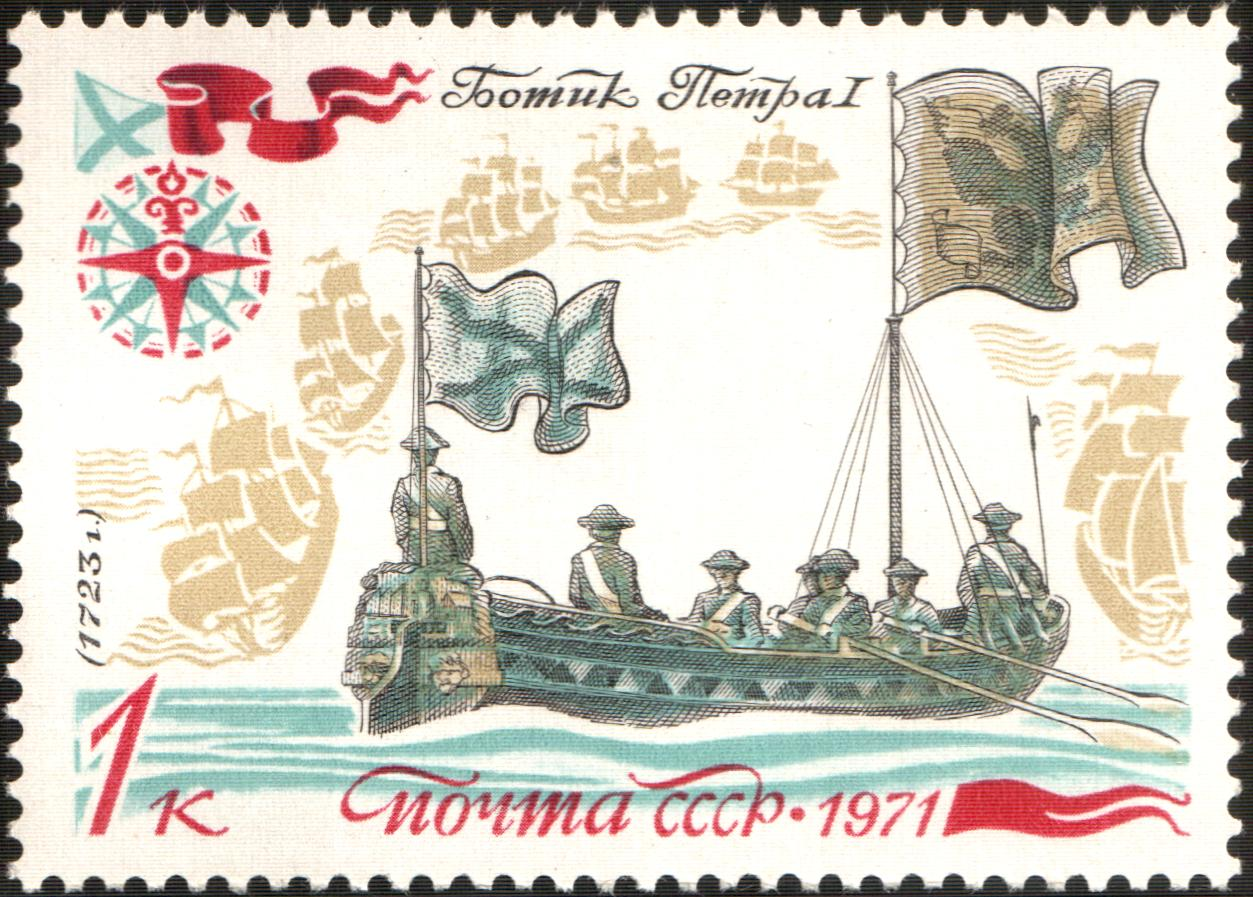
1971 Soviet stamp depicting the boat

=== Soviet era ===
The importance of the boat, like most other memorials from Imperial Russia, was reduced in the early Soviet era. Guidebooks to Leningrad at the time did not reference the boat. The boat was moved to Peterhof in 1928 and remained there until World War II. During the outbreak of World War II, patriotism related to Peter the Great resurfaced. He was referenced as conqueror of Germans and the founder of what became the Soviet Navy. The importance of the boat increased with him, and it was moved to the Central Naval Museum of the St. Petersburg Bourse in September 1940.

=== Post-Soviet era ===
The boat made its first foray outside Russia in 1997 when it was displayed in the Winter Garden Atrium of the World Financial Center in New York City. While being displayed as part of the "St. Petersburg: A Cultural Celebration" festival, the boat was attended to by two preservationists. The preservationists attempted to identify the species of oak used in the boat so that the country of origin could be determined in addition to scraping off dirt and patching cracks.
