= Izmaylovo Estate =

Imperial Russian country residence in Moscow

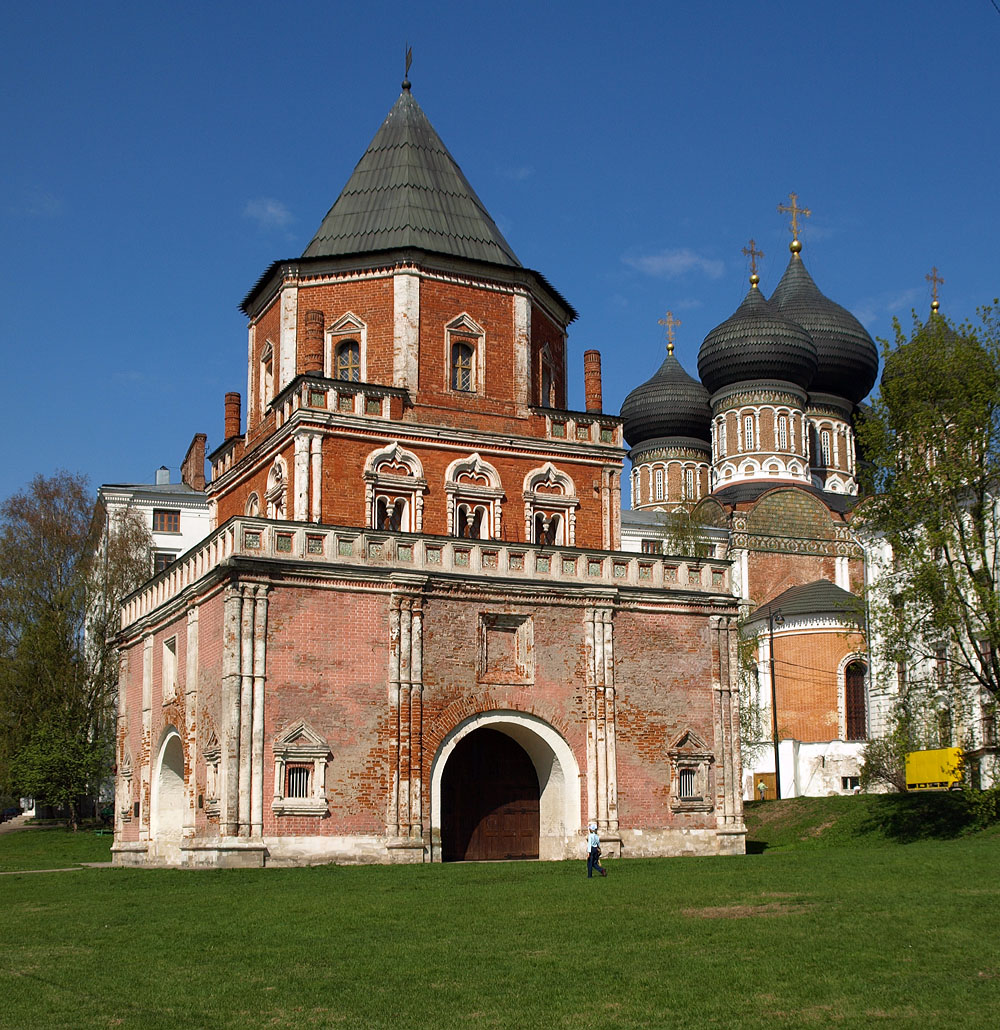
Barbican tower and Cathedral of Intercession, built in the 1670s.

Izmaylovo Estate (Russian: Усадьба Измайлово) was a country residence of the House of Romanov built in the reign of Alexis I of Russia. Originally located 7 kilometres east of Moscow's city limits, it became part of the expanding city in the 20th century. Its territory spanned 10 to 15 square kilometres of the Serebryanka river valley and corresponds, roughly, to present-day Izmaylovo Forest, Terletsky Forest (south-east) and the Cherkizovo market (north-west) territories between the inner ring of the Moscow Railroad and the MKAD beltway.

The estate briefly flourished under Tsar Alexis and his daughter Sophia Alekseyevna, being the center of a large estate park with model farms, workshops and hunting reserves. The heart of the estate, the Izmailovo Court of Tsar Alexis (Russian: Государев двор в Измайлово, 55°47′30″N 37°45′44″E), was a wooden palace built on an artificial island - a hill surrounded by man-made ponds. The present-day Court retains two sets of palace gates, a cathedral and a barbican tower built in the 1670s-1680s. Other extant structures of the Court were built by Konstantin Thon and Mikhail Bykovsky in 1839–1859, when the island was converted into an almshouse, and in the 1970s. The present-day Court is a freely accessible open-air museum.

== History ==
=== Background ===
Nikita Yuryev, younger brother of Anastasia Romanovna, acquired Izmaylovo village in the middle of the 16th century. Members of Romanov-Zakharyin-Yuryev clan owned lands in north-eastern Russian provinces, and conveniently placed their suburban residences in the eastern and north-eastern suburbs of Moscow (Rubtsovo, Preobrazhenskoye et al.). Izmaylovo village with wooden Romanov court was placed on a hill surrounded by Serebryanka river bend; it became a center of a hunting reserve, and most of its residents catered to the Romanov hunt. The dams and ponds that turned a hill into an island existed back in the 16th century, but then the hill remained connected to the mainland with a narrow tract of solid ground.

Izmaylovo was destroyed during the Time of Troubles but soon restored to its original function by the Romanov-Yuryev family. In 1655 this line of the Romanovs went extinct and its properties inherited by the reigning Tsar Alexis. Alexis consolidated numerous Romanov lands into a continuous tract spanning from Yauza River in the west to Kuskovo and Pekhorka River in the east. Alexis repopulated the lands with peasants (548 households) and tradesmen (216 households) relocated from the provinces.

=== Prosperity ===
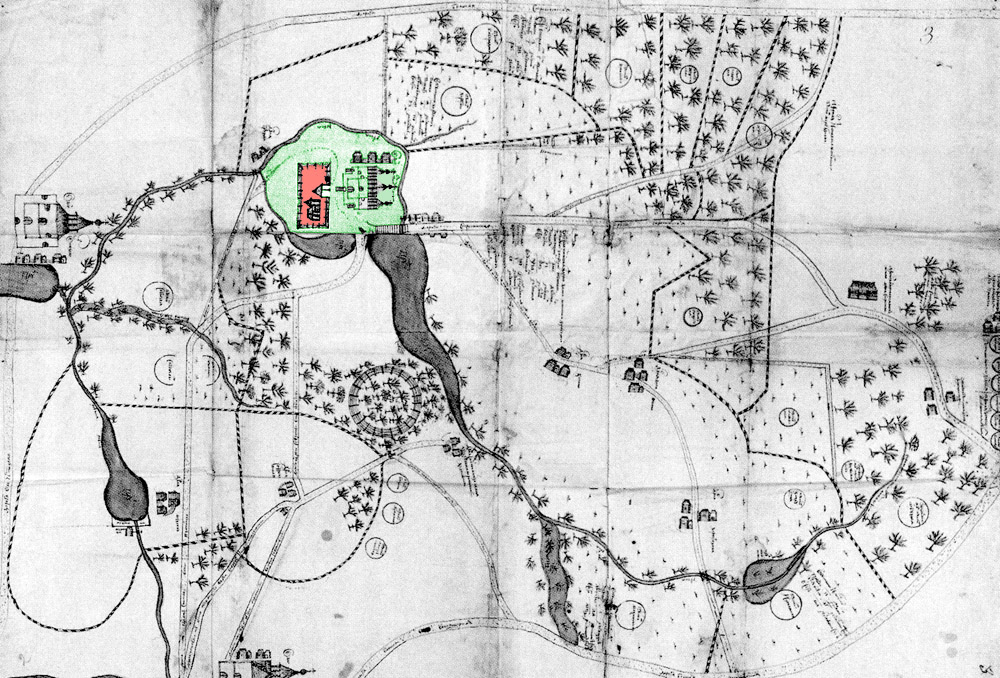
Map of Izmaylovo, 1664, prior to major redevelopment. Note that the "island" (green) with the Court (red) is still connected to the mainland. The circular structure below it is the Menagerie, here still without a circular moat. Small, faint circles indicate unused land suitable for farming or construction. In fact, there were far fewer trees than now.

In 1663 Alexis settled to convert his personal domain into a technologically advanced center of Russian economy; he believed that agricultural technologies and crafts could be perfected to a point where domestic produce can substitute imports of wine, silk, cotton and spices. Another, less ambitious, objective was to grow commercial quantities of traditional Russian produce - wheat and linen. Most of this plan did, in fact, materialize. Izmaylovo vineyards, protected in winter by insulating mats, were sustained for decades; melons grew in soil brought from Astrakhan, figs and coconuts in greenhouses, although slowly. The stubborn silk worm appears to be the only absolute failure. Records of Izmaylovo inventory, including names of hundreds of Russian and foreign employees, were compiled soon after the death of Alexis and preserved in archives together with original architectural plans of the 1660s, making Izmaylovo the best documented of 17th century estates in Russia.

Between 1664 and 1670 Serebryanka River and its lesser tributaries were crossed by dams, creating a system of more than 20 large and small ponds (the larger ponds are extant to date). This provided enough water for irrigation and fisheries and power to the water mills. The hill of historical Izmaylovo was cut from the mainland with a wide moat; Alexis claimed the island as his exclusive residence and relocated Izmaylovo village to a new site 2 kilometers north, marked by present-day Izmaylovo Cemetery and church of Nativity of Christ, erected in 1676-1677 (55°48′4″N 37°46′9″E).

Overall layout of Izmaylovo estate, dictated by the rivers, was irregular, but each individual farm or workshop was designed in a highly symmetrical fashion. The vineyard (55°47′58″N 37°45′1″E), fig tree (55°46′28″N 37°47′10″E) and proso (55°46′19″N 37°49′2″E) farms were set up as regular squares; the 15-acre medicinal herb garden (55°47′4″N 37°46′11″E) and flax farm as perfect circles. The Wolf Farm that raised wild beasts for hunting was protected with a perfectly circular moat (55°46′19″N 37°46′3″E); another, extant, circular moat (55°47′34″N 37°50′8″E) served as a fire reservoir for the brick kilns in the eastern end of the estate; five kilns were placed around the moat in a star pattern. The estate also featured a pure folly, the Babylon - Muscovy's first labyrinth, placed halfway between the Tsar's Court and the Wolf Farm. Wolf Farm, or Menagerie (Russian: Зверинец) housed beasts from sables to polar bears and is thus credited to be Russia's first zoo.

In 1671 Alexis launched construction of the Cathedral of Intercession on the eastern side of the island; it was connected to the mainland with a stone bridge and protected by a massive barbican tower that doubled as the bell tower for the cathedral. The 14-span bridge was 100 metres long and 14 metres wide; present-day pond in this place is no more than 20 metres wide. There were no military-grade fortifications; Izmaylovo was never intended to withstand a regular siege.

The Cathedral of Intercession was built in 1671-1679 as a memorial to the expulsion of Poles in 1618 and modeled after the Alexandrov cathedral, but with five domes and without inhabitable basement. Construction is credited to architect Ivan Kuznechik, author of the church of Saint Gregory in Yakimanka District of Moscow; Kuznechik employed teams of craftsmen from Kostroma. Ceramic tiling was produced by craftsmen from Belarus in 1673. Iconostasis, icons and internal finishes were made by Moscow natives and monks of Troitse-Sergiyeva Lavra. The cathedral stood out for its use of large (25×33 cm) coloured ceramic tiles with Eye of a peacock motive (extant) and unusually large window surfaces (lost during the 1840s reconstruction). Initially the cathedral exterior was finished in unpainted red brick; in 1729 it was painted white and is currently back to original red brick.

Alexis also planned to rebuild old wooden Court into a grand palace; construction began in 1676, but Alexis died in the same year. The new Court and the cathedral were completed in the 1680s by regent Sophia Alekseyevna. The main palace, placed on the southern edge of the court, was traditionally built of wood; service building on the northern side were built in brick and stone. The palace also incorporated house church of Saint Joasaph (1680).

=== Decline ===
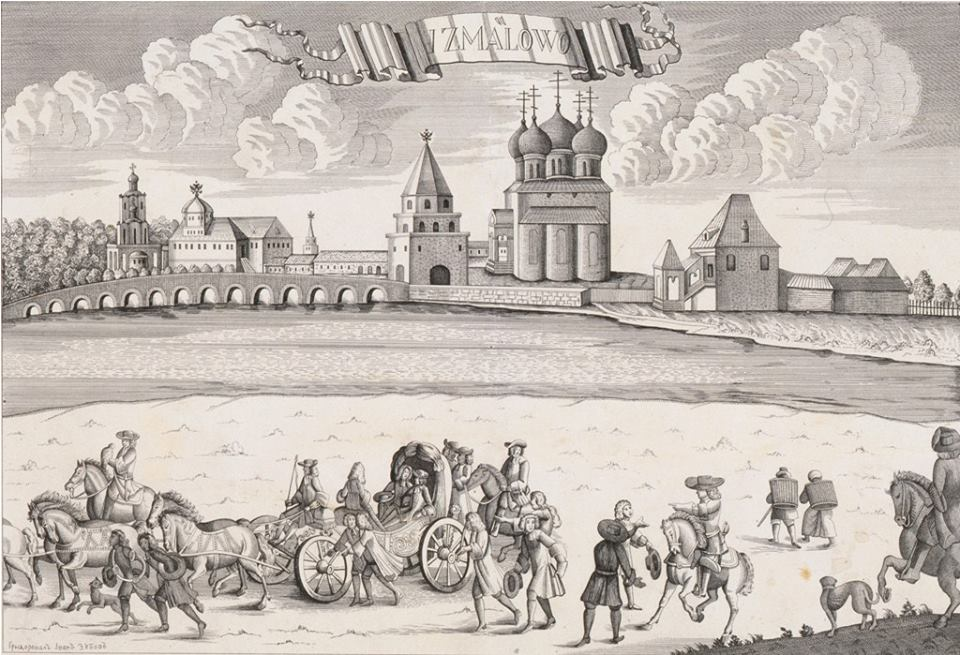
Izmaylovo island in the 1720s. Left to right: * Stone bridge (demolished in 1760) * Church of Saint Joasaph (demolished in 1937) * 1703 palace (demolished in 1760) * Tower above the gates of the Court (extant) * Barbican tower (extant) * Cathedral of Intercession (extant) * Mill on Izmaylovo dam (demolished)

Sophia, engaged in political rivalry with the Naryshkin clan, invested into palace security and rebuilt the church of Saint Joasaph but neglected the farms of Izmaylovo. In May 1688, when young Peter I of Russia discovered a legendary English boat in Nikita Romanov's warehouse at the Flax Farm, the farm itself was abandoned. Peter used the remote ponds and islands of Izmaylovo to train his private mock army, but he did not care to restore the Ismaylovo economy.

After the fall of Sophia Izmaylovo Court passed to Ivan V of Russia (Peter's half-brother) and after his death housed his widow and daughters, including future empress Anna. Peter, as the legal guardian of his late brother's offspring, remained a welcomed guest of Izmaylovo Court. In 1700 the wooden palace was destroyed by a fire and soon replaced by another wooden structure. The new palace, inaugurated in January 1703, was set on a different site, closer to the water. Later, when Peter arranged marriages of Ivan's daughters to foreign princes, the palace became well known to Western guests. Cornelius de Bruin, attending the 1703 inauguration, described it as splendid, while the visitors of the 1720s complained about decrepit conditions and poor interiors. The Menagerie acquired its first Indian elephant in 1714 from the Shah of Persia but later fell into disrepair as well.

Anna of Russia, who became an Empress in 1730, refitted the palace, restored the Menagerie and reverted the territory to its original function as a hunting reserve. Izmaylovo Court was once again repopulated by horse grooms, dog and falcon trainers and their animals. In 1745 Elisabeth of Russia relocated the principal residence from the island to the south, near the Menagerie. She connected the new country palace with Aleksey Razumovsky estate in Perovo with a new road that is currently known as the Main Alley (Russian: Главная Аллея) of Izmaylovo Park. The old court on the island was abandoned; the circular pond around it was drained, and the bridge and wooden palace were demolished in the 1760s.

The new palace by the Menagerie was eventually abandoned as well; the Menagerie was destroyed during the war of 1812 and was formally closed in 1826. The Cathedral operated in the 1760s-1800s only on special occasions and was closed in 1828.

=== Reconstruction ===
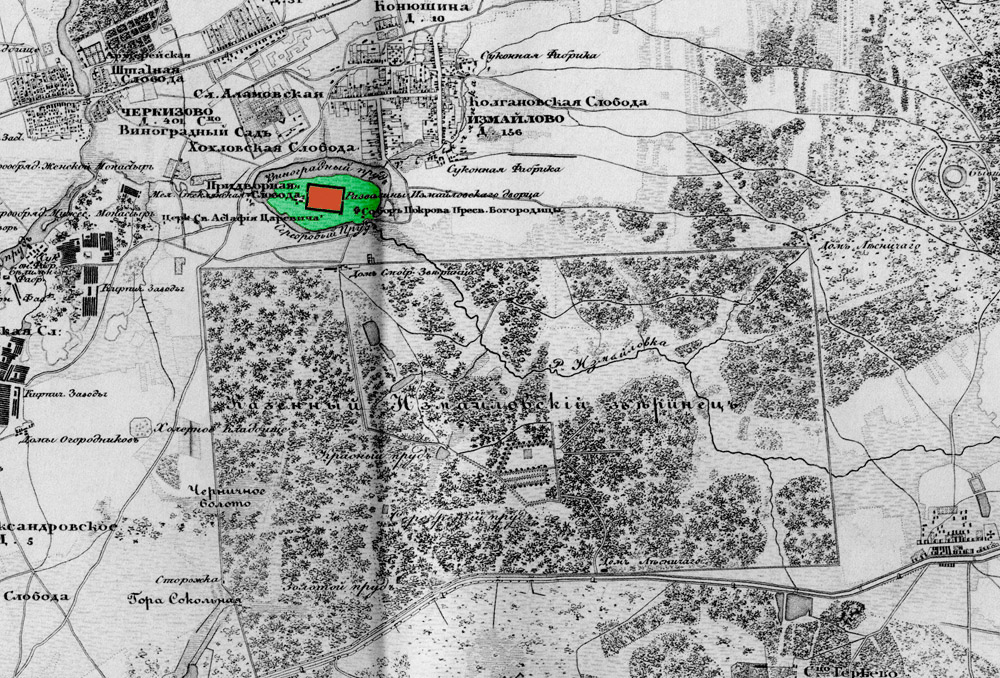
Map of Izmailovo, 1848. The main island (green) is encircled by a proper pond, Izmailovo Park shown as a walled hunting reserve. Note that present-day ponds in the park are missing: they were recreated in the 1930s. A circular pond of the former brick kilns, independent of the main river system, is visible in top right.

In 1837 Nicholas I of Russia identified former Izmaylovo Court as the site of future almshouse for the veterans of Napoleonic Wars and assigned Konstantin Thon to manage the rehabilitation project. Thon initially planned to retain and repair the buildings of the old Court perimeter and add two-story residential wings to the cathedral. However, the plans changed and the perimeter buildings were demolished, with the exception of front and rear gates and church of Saint Joasaph. Instead, Thon rebuilt parts of the perimeter with single-story "historical style" buildings; parts were simply replaced with a fence.

The main residential wings of Thon's almshouse were attached directly to the cathedral walls, blocking its windows and concealing the cathedral from view from north, south and east. The western facade remains clear of 19th century additions. At the same time, Thon is credited with literally salvaging the cathedral from an imminent collapse: shallow foundations, set on unstable soil, caused severe deformation and cracking of cathedral walls. Thon raised ground and floor levels to immobilize foundations, arranged proper water drainage and reinforced cathedral walls with iron braces.

The almshouse was designed to provide shelter to 432 veterans (some of them with spouses); fresh food was supplied by a new farm established on the site of former grape plantation. The village of Izmaylovo became a textile town; the largest mill, owned by Englishman Robert Hill, employed over 1,500 workers. By 1917 Izmaylovo housed over 5,000 residents.

In the 1860s the Society of Animal and Plant Acclimatization attempted to resume 17th century experiments and set up a model honey bee and silk worm farms on the site of the historical proso farm. Exhibition hall of the Society, built in the 1880s by an unnamed English engineer, was the first reinforced concrete building in Moscow. Existing trees of the regular Izmaylovo Park were planted in the same period (1865–1890).

After the Russian Revolution of 1917 the almshouses were closed and converted to ordinary housing under the name of Nikolay Bauman settlement. When these residents were resettled to new homes after World War II, the almshouses were occupied in part by the State Historical Museum, in part by the Electrotechnical Institute. The cathedral was closed in 1920, converted to an archive and survived a fire in 1935. The church of Saint Joasaph was demolished in 1936-1937. Church of Nativity in Izmaylovo village, on the contrary, operated continuously throughout the Soviet period. The ponds in Izmaylovo, drained in the 1760s, were filled with water again in the 1930s; their present configuration is quite similar to the 17th century, except for a lesser number of dams.

In the 1970s the fence of the Court perimeter was replaced with low, single-story perimeter buildings that complete the structure designed by Thon and blend with the 17th century gates.

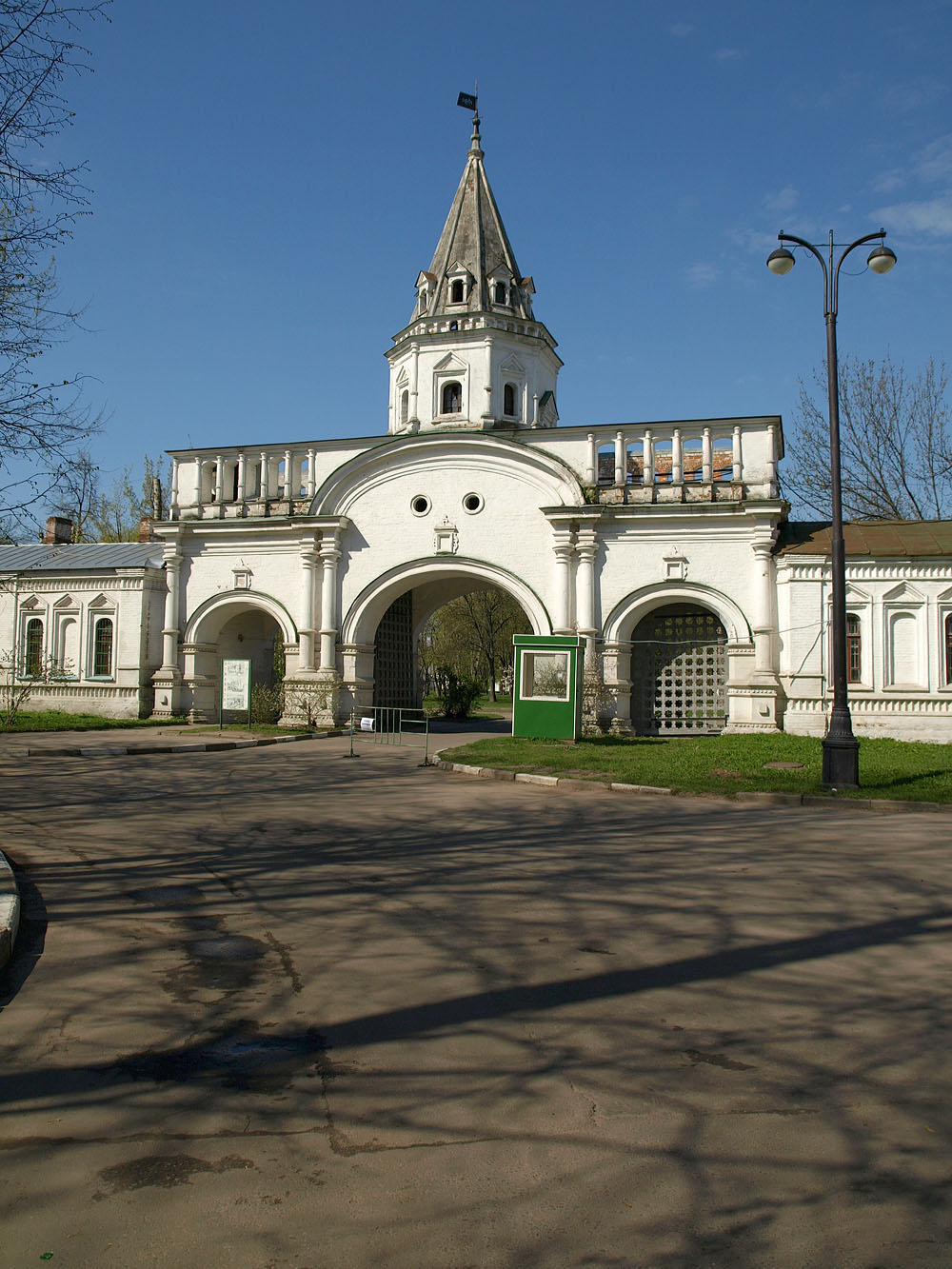
Gates, 1670s

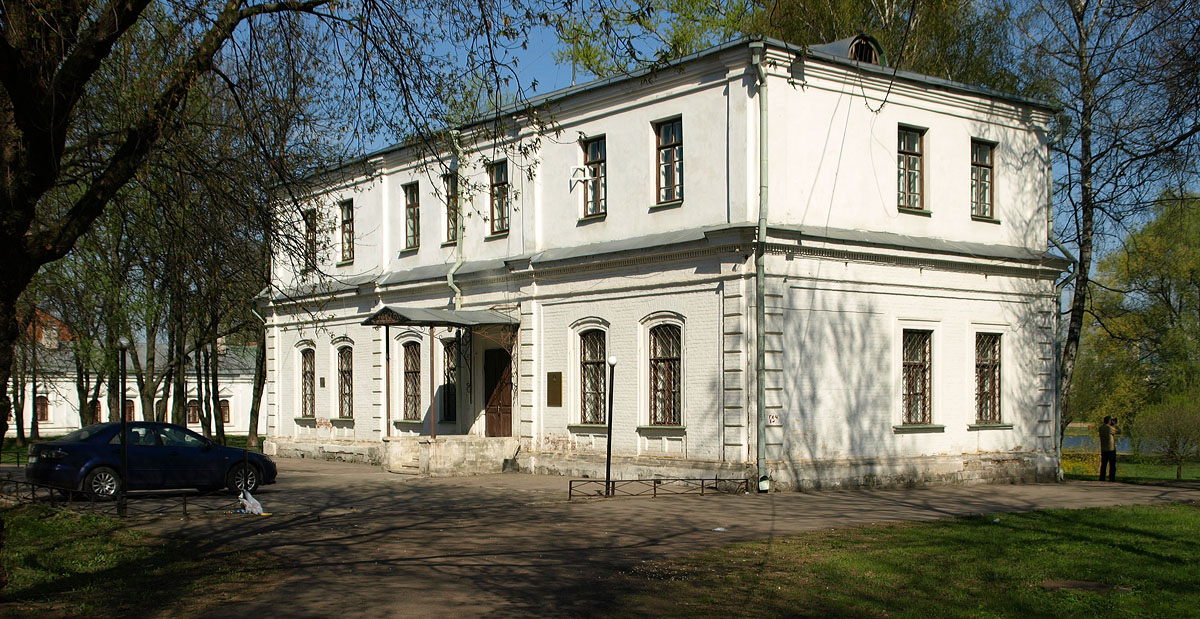
Almshouse, 1840s

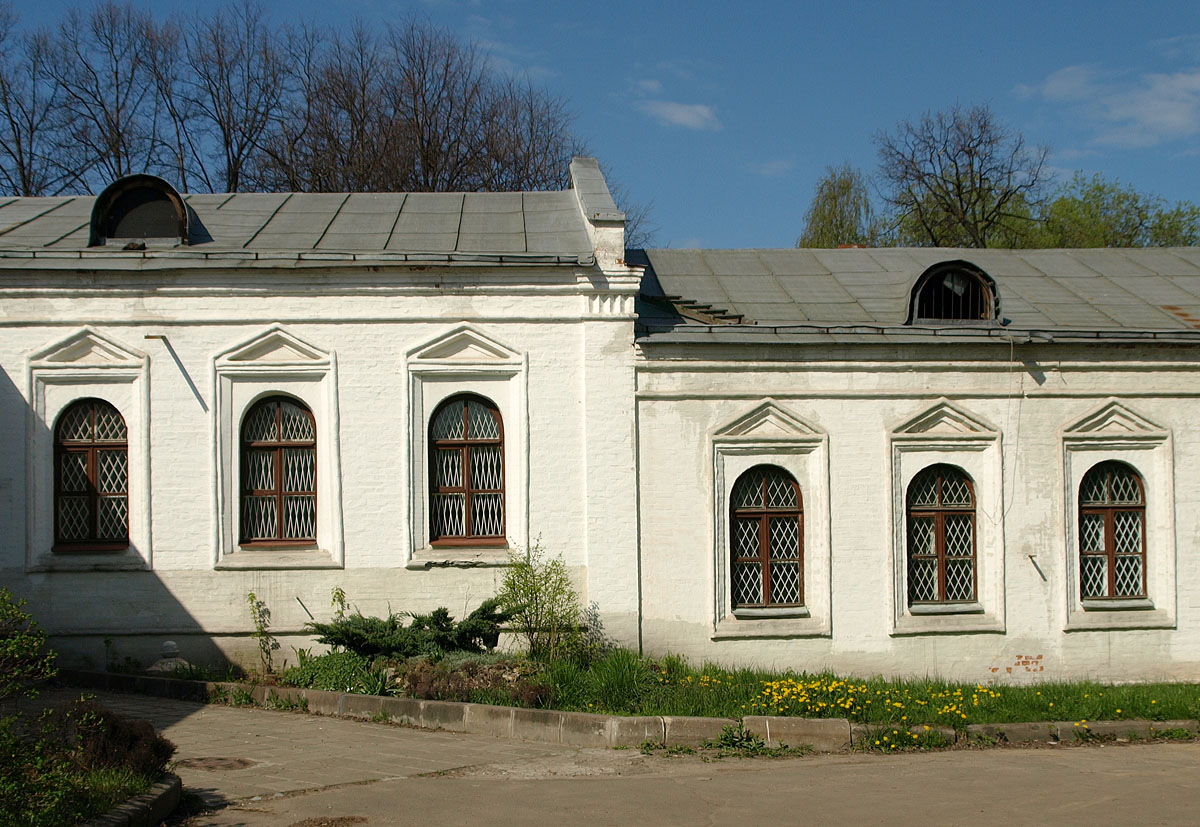
Infill block, 1970s

Cathedral of Intercession was restored externally in the 1960s and reopened as an Orthodox church in 1993. In September 2008, historical buildings of the Tsar's Court were operated as a division of the Moscow United Museum, which also included Kolomenskoe, Lefortovo and Lyublino Estate. The Court itself (but not the interiors of the Court buildings) is freely accessible to the public. There is a small exhibition of 17th-century art in the ground floor of the barbican tower; the tower periodically houses chamber music concerts.
