= Jean-François Thomas de Thomon =

French architect (1760–1813)

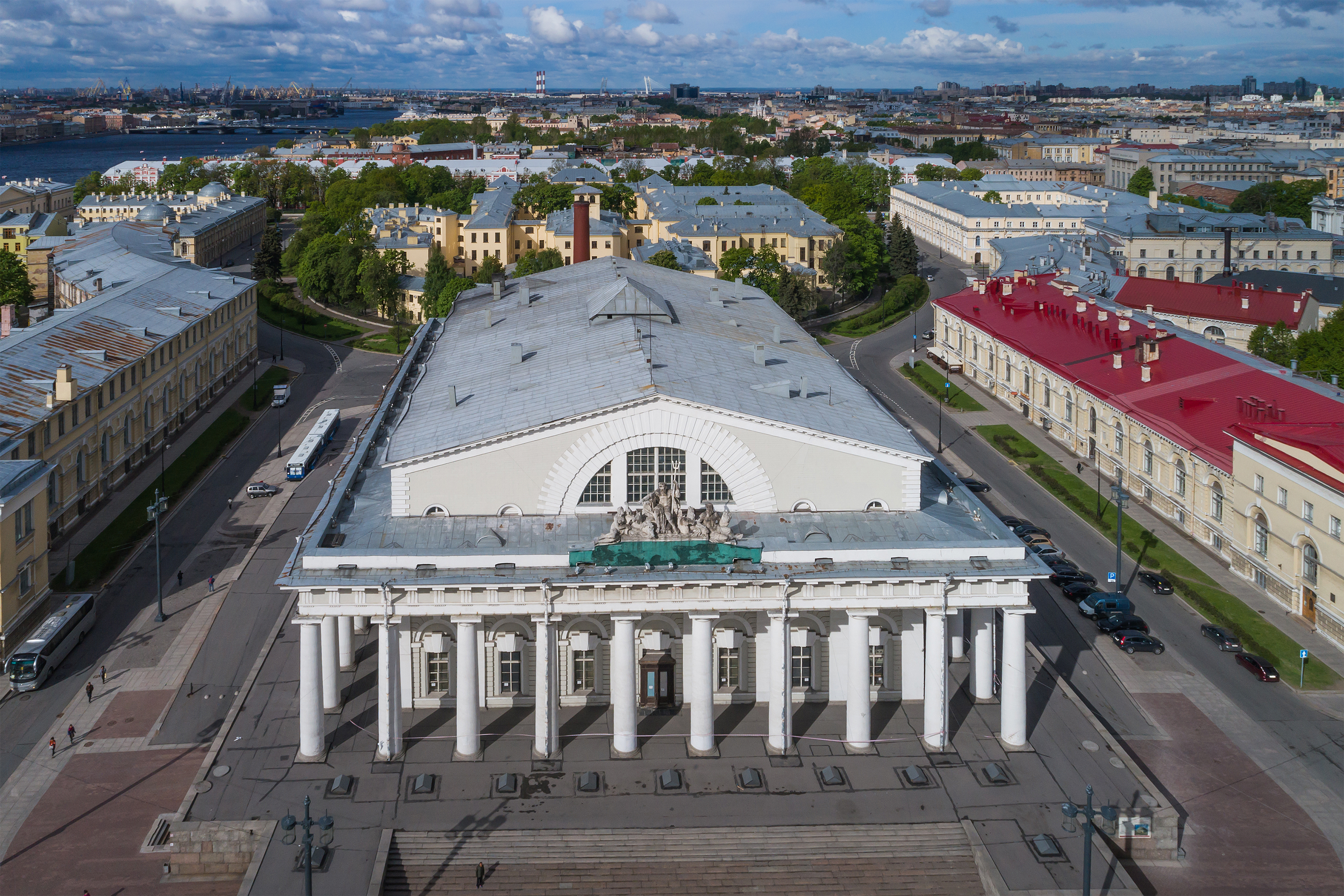
Saint Petersburg Exchange

Jean-François Thomas de Thomon (12 April [O.S. 1 April] 1760 – 4 September [O.S. 23 August] 1813) was a French neoclassical architect who worked in Eastern Europe in 1791–1813. Thomas de Thomon was responsible for the design of Old Saint Petersburg Stock Exchange and Rostral Columns on the spit of Vasilievsky Island in Saint Petersburg and the first building of the Odessa Theatre, destroyed by fire in 1873. Thomas de Thomon, graduate of the French Academy in Rome, "imported" the high classicism practiced by this school in 1780s into Russia and thus contributed to the formation of Russian national variant of neoclassicism practiced during the reign of Alexander I.

== Biography ==
Jean-François Thomas was born in a third estate family in Paris and has demonstrated talents in graphic arts since early childhood. His early works, preserved in the archive of Jean-Claude Richard, were influenced by Jean-Honoré Fragonard and Hubert Robert. At the age of 17 Thomas was admitted to the class of Julien-David Le Roy at the Académie royale d'architecture, and trained there along with Karl von Moreaux, Charles Percier and Pierre François Léonard Fontaine. All his attempts to win a state scholarship for a study tour of Italy failed, and in 1785 he left for Rome on his own account, and attended the classes of the French Academy in Rome as a stowaway along with legitimate students. His squatting in Rome continued for years; Thomas risked being expelled from the Academy had it not been for the patronage of François-Guillaume Ménageot.

Thomas returned to France in 1789 and was hired by Charles, Comte d'Artois, however, the employment was cut short by the French Revolution. He left the country again and travelled through Italy, Austria and Poland, "acquiring" the noble style of Thomas de Thomon at some point in early 1790s. Dmitry Shvidkovsky wrote that, quite likely, emigration resulted from Thomas's own political allegiance to monarchy(he was "an ardent royalist and a fervent Catholic" throughout his life) and practical inability "to realize architectural dreams of the last years of the Ancien Régime" in revolutionary France.

His first tangible work of the period, rebuilding the gallery of Łańcut Castle for the Lubomirski family, instantly elevated him into the circle of leading architects of Eastern Europe. In 1794 he was hired by House of Esterházy in Vienna; at least two of his building, a school in Vienna and a bathhouse in Eisenstadt, survived to date in Austria.

Earlier, most likely in 1792, he met with Russian ambassador to Vienna, prince Dmitry Golitsyn; in 1798 Thomas de Thomon accepted invitation from his brother Alexander, then living in Moscow. Russian Empire at that time was closed to all Frenchmen in fear of revolutionary ideas. Thomas de Thomon sneaked into the country through Hamburg and Riga, assuming a persona of a Swiss citizen, native of Bern.

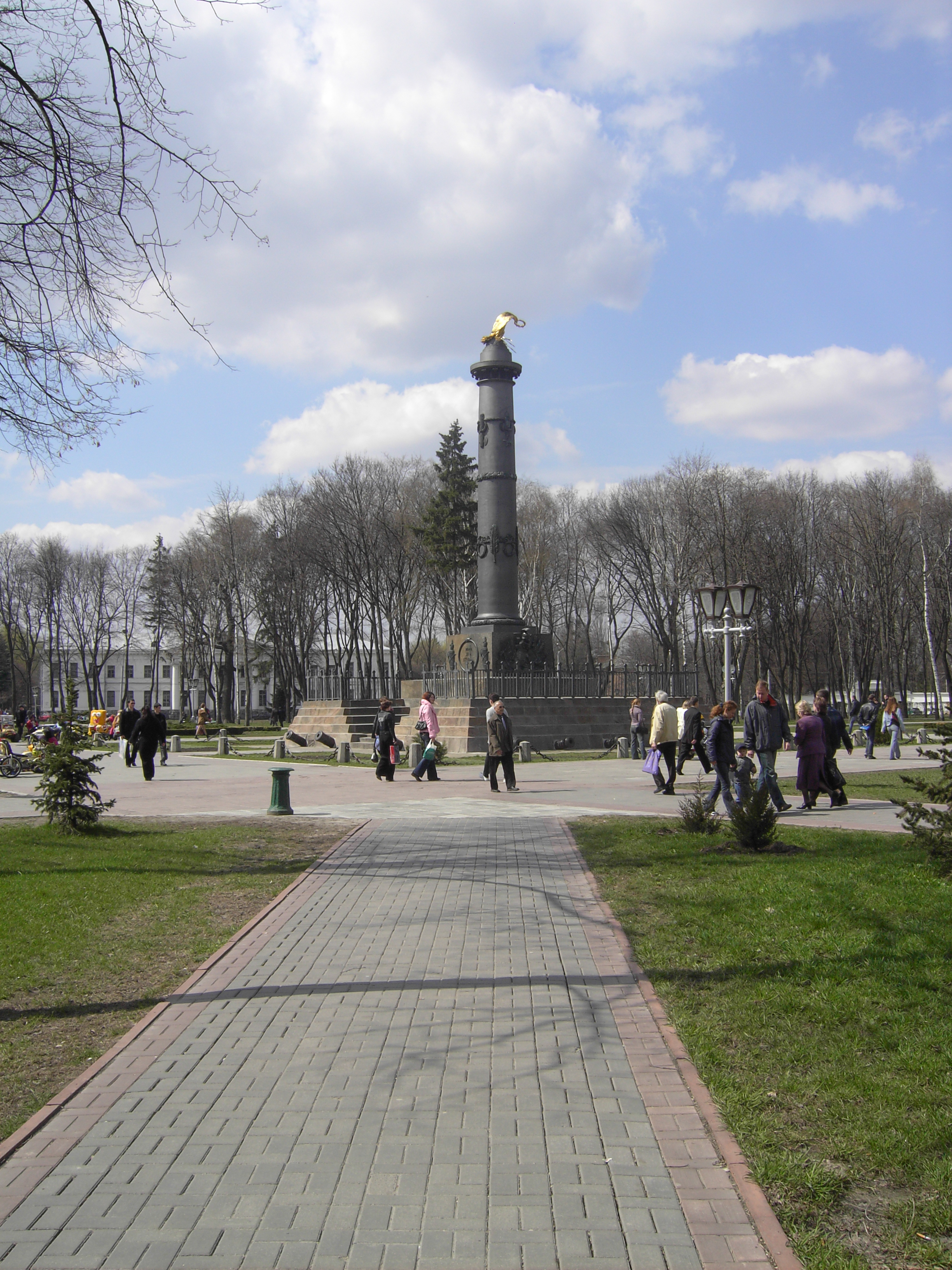
Monument in Poltava

Thomas de Thomon initially worked for the Golytsins in their country residences and later relocated to Saint Petersburg; on 30 January 1802 he was hired by the Imperial government to rebuild Bolshoi Kamenny Theatre. The project that started as a modest refit soon expanded into a full-scale rebuild to Thomon's own draft. It was structurally completed in one year; Thomas de Thomon remained its architect until the fire of 1 January 1811.

In 1804 Thomas de Thomon applied to an architectural contest to design naval warehouses on Matisov Island in Saint Petersburg; the resulting contract, completed in 1807, was split among three competing architects: facades were built to Thomas de Thomon's design while floorplans and construction management were handled by his rivals. The buildings were demolished in 1914, Lev Rudnev reused their stone blocks for a monument on the Field of Mars.

In 1807–1809 Thomas de Thomon supervised construction of the monument to Paul I of Russia in Pavlovsk. The contract was won in an open contest against Andrey Voronikhin, Andreyan Zakharov and Pietro Gonzaga. Another monument by Thomas de Thomon, a column commemorating centennial of the Battle of Poltava, was erected in Poltava in 1805–1811. In 1806–1809 he built three monumental fountains around Pulkovo Heights, one to design by Voronikhin and two of his own. Two of them were later relocated to downtown Saint Petersburg (to Sennaya Square and Kazan Cathedral Square).

His best known work, Old Stock Exchange on the spit of Vasilyevsky Island, was completed in 1805–1810 to a design approved shortly before the death of Paul of Russia; Thomon's drafts were preferred to earlier 1781 proposal by Giacomo Quarenghi, that was suspended in 1784. Quarenghi placed his Exchange on the southern side of the island, facing the Palace Embankment. Thomas de Thomon radically moved his building on the island's axis, producing a highly symmetrical ensemble tying together the island and both sides of the Neva River, from the Winter Palace to the Peter and Paul Fortress.

Thomon died in 1813 after an accidental fall from the scaffolding of the Petersburg Bolshoi Theatre, then being restored after a fire.

== Critical assessment ==
Igor Grabar, analyzing the difference between Italian and French versions of neoclassicism in Russia, considered Carlo Rossi and Thomas de Thomon the key figures of these branches of the same style. Thomas de Thomon was the principal source for French classicism in Russia, complementing utopian fantasies of Claude Nicolas Ledoux with "a new trait that never appeared before – a serious, well-considered understanding, perhaps less dexterity but more depth." Grabar noted that Thomas de Thomon apparently "borrowed" the sweeping shape of the Exchange from the stylistic experiments of the French architectural competitions hosted by Académie royale d'architecture. Yet, he continued, original French designs were never intended for execution in stone; even their authors regarded them as nothing more than an exercise in draftsmanship. Unlike them, Thomas de Thomon "retained the sacred gift of insanity for the sake of beauty" and dared to actually build his ideal of beauty in stone. "He was not a colossus as some represent him now, he was not a Palladio and not even a Rastrelli. Russia has seen greater architects before and after him. But he was a Prometheus, who, having stolen the flame of new beauty from the gods in France, brought it to Russia."

== In culture ==
In June 2011, Russian artist Alexander Taratynov installed a life-size statue of Thomas de Thomon in Saint Petersburg. The statue is part of The Architects, a bronze sculptural group depicting the great architects of Russian Empire as commissioned by Gazprom and installed in Alexander Park. In 2018, Taratynov admitted he used a picture he found on Wikipedia to base the statue on, and that it was actually an image of the Scottish chemist Thomas Thomson – Taratynov blamed Wikipedia for the error but also himself for not checking with a historian to verify it was accurate.

== Sources ==
- Lisovsky, V. G. (2008). Ivan Fomin i metamorfozy russkoy neoklassiki (Иван Фомин и метаморфозы русской неоклассики) (in Russian). Saint Petersburg:Kolo. ISBN 978-5-901841-44-0.
- Albert J. Schmidt (1989). The architecture and planning of classical Moscow: a cultural history. DIANE Publishing. ISBN 978-0-87169-181-1.
- Shvidkovsky, Dmitry (2007). Russian architecture and the West. Yale University Press. ISBN 978-0-300-10912-2.
- Shuisky, V. K. (2008). Zolotoy vek barocco i classicizma v Sankt-Peterburge (Золотой век барокко и классицизма в Санкт-Петербургу) (in Russian). Centrpoligraph. ISBN 978-5-9524-3777-7.
