= Central Naval Museum =

Naval museum in Saint Petersburg, Russia

Coordinates: 59°56′37″N 30°18′16″E

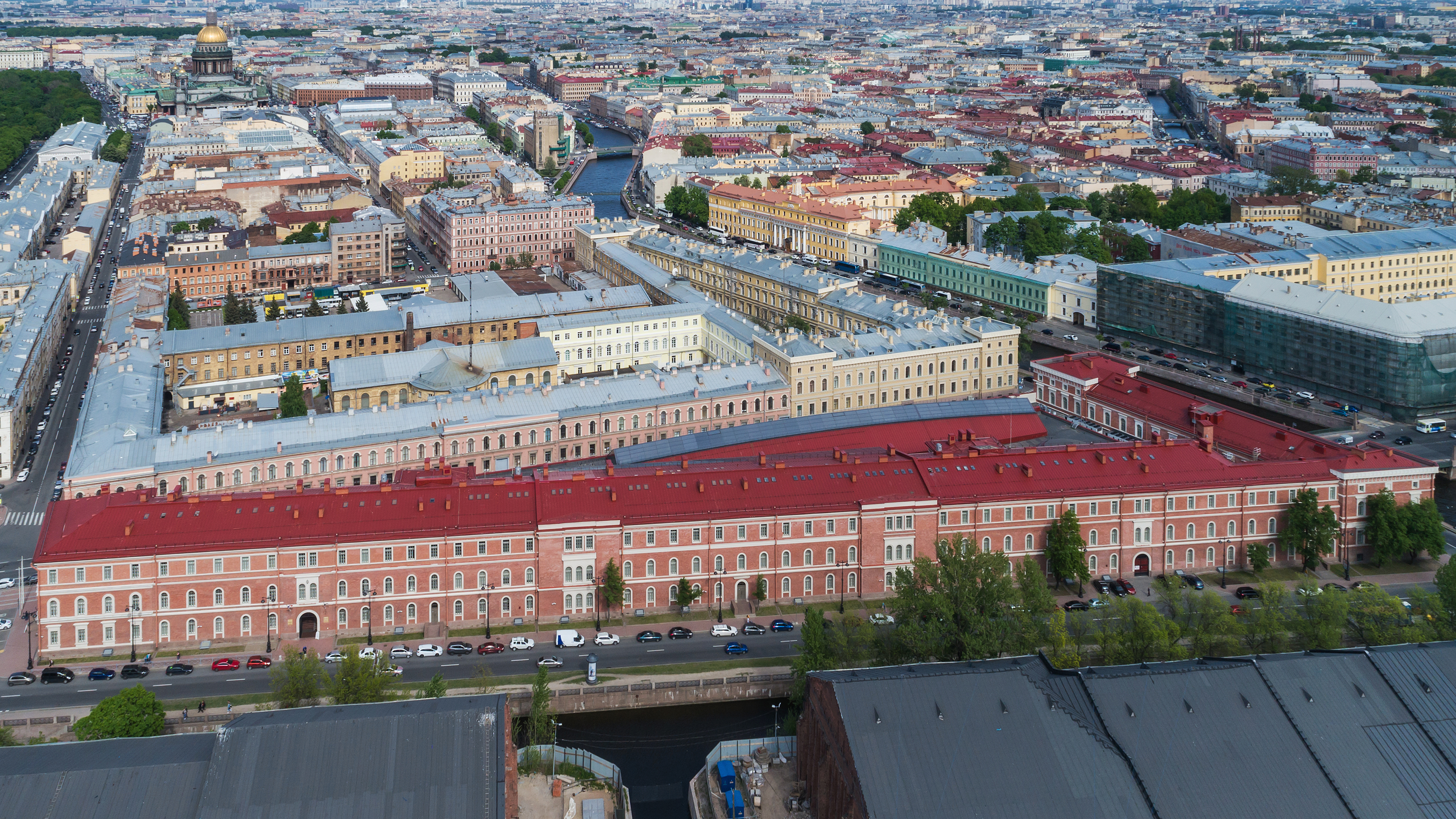
Central Naval Museum

Central Naval Museum (Russian: Центральный военно-морской музей имени императора Петра Великого, lit. 'Central Military Maritime Museum named after Emperor Peter the Great') is a naval museum in St Petersburg, Russia, reflecting the development of Russian naval traditions and the history of the Russian Navy. The museum’s permanent display includes such relics as the Botik of Peter the Great, Catherine II’s marine throne, trophies captured in sea battles, and the personal belongings of prominent Russian and Soviet naval commanders. The collection includes paintings by Ivan Aivazovsky, Alexey Bogolyubov, Lev Lagorio and other marine artists, ship sculpture, navigational instruments, naval equipment and machinery from the 17th to 20th centuries and numerous models of ships.

== History ==
=== Imperial era ===
The museum originates from the St. Petersburg Model Chamber, used to store models and drawings related to shipbuilding. The Model Chamber was first mentioned in records on 24 January 1709, the date now used as the birthday of the museum.

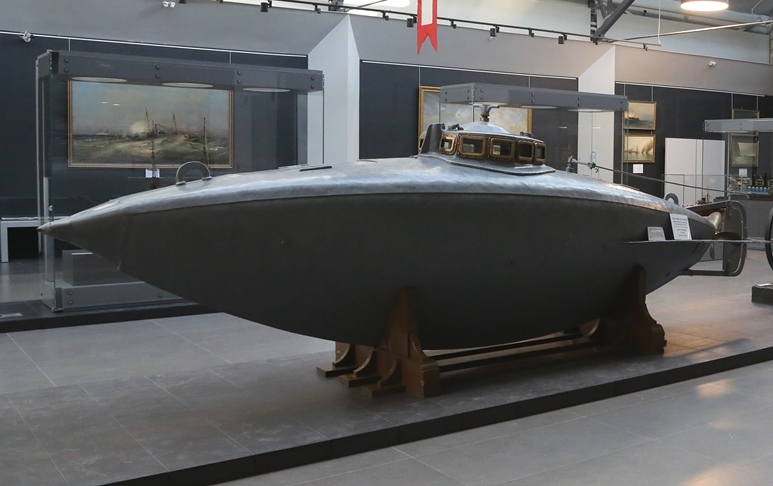
Dzhevetskiy submarine

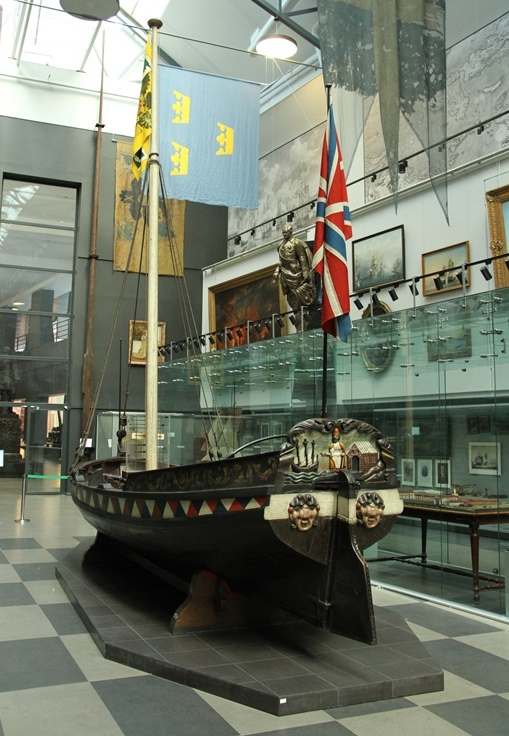
Botik of Peter the Great

The Model Chamber's collection became the basis for a "Maritime Museum", which was created in 1805.

=== Soviet era ===
In August 1939 the Central Naval Museum was relocated to the Stock Exchange building. It opened in its new location in February 1941, but its work was interrupted four months later by the German invasion of the Soviet Union and the beginning of the Great Patriotic War.

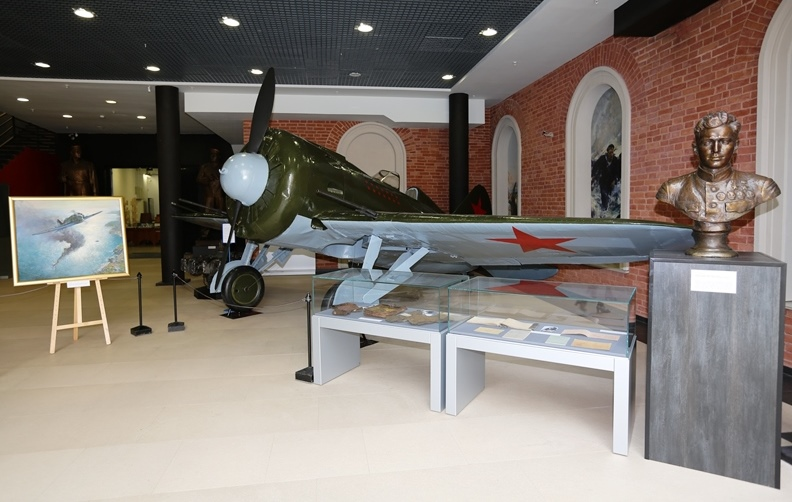
I-16 fighter of Twice-Hero of the Soviet Union Lt. Col. Boris Safonov

=== The museum today ===
The museum organizes joint exhibitions with Russian and foreign museums.

== Gallery ==
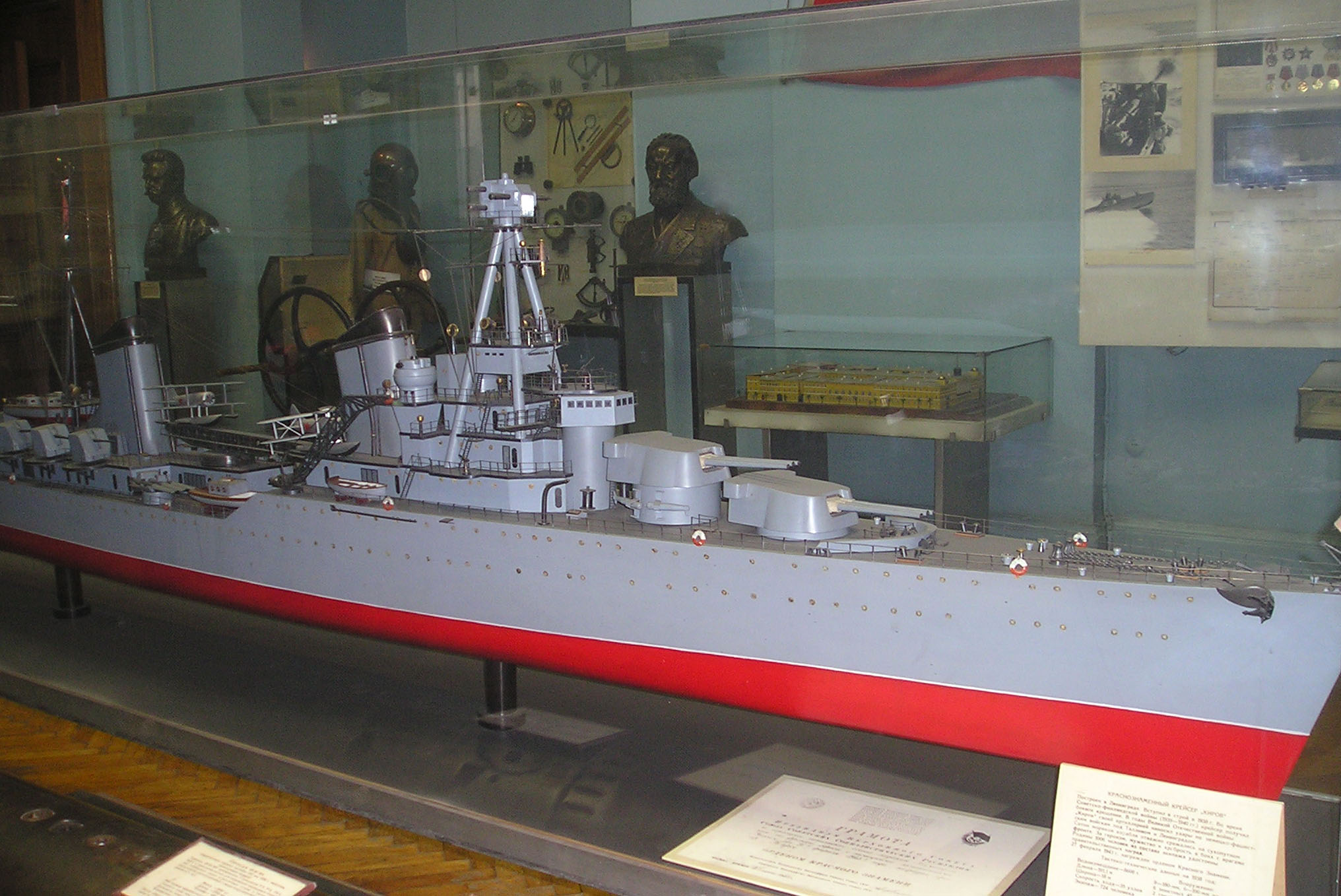
Model of cruiser Kirov

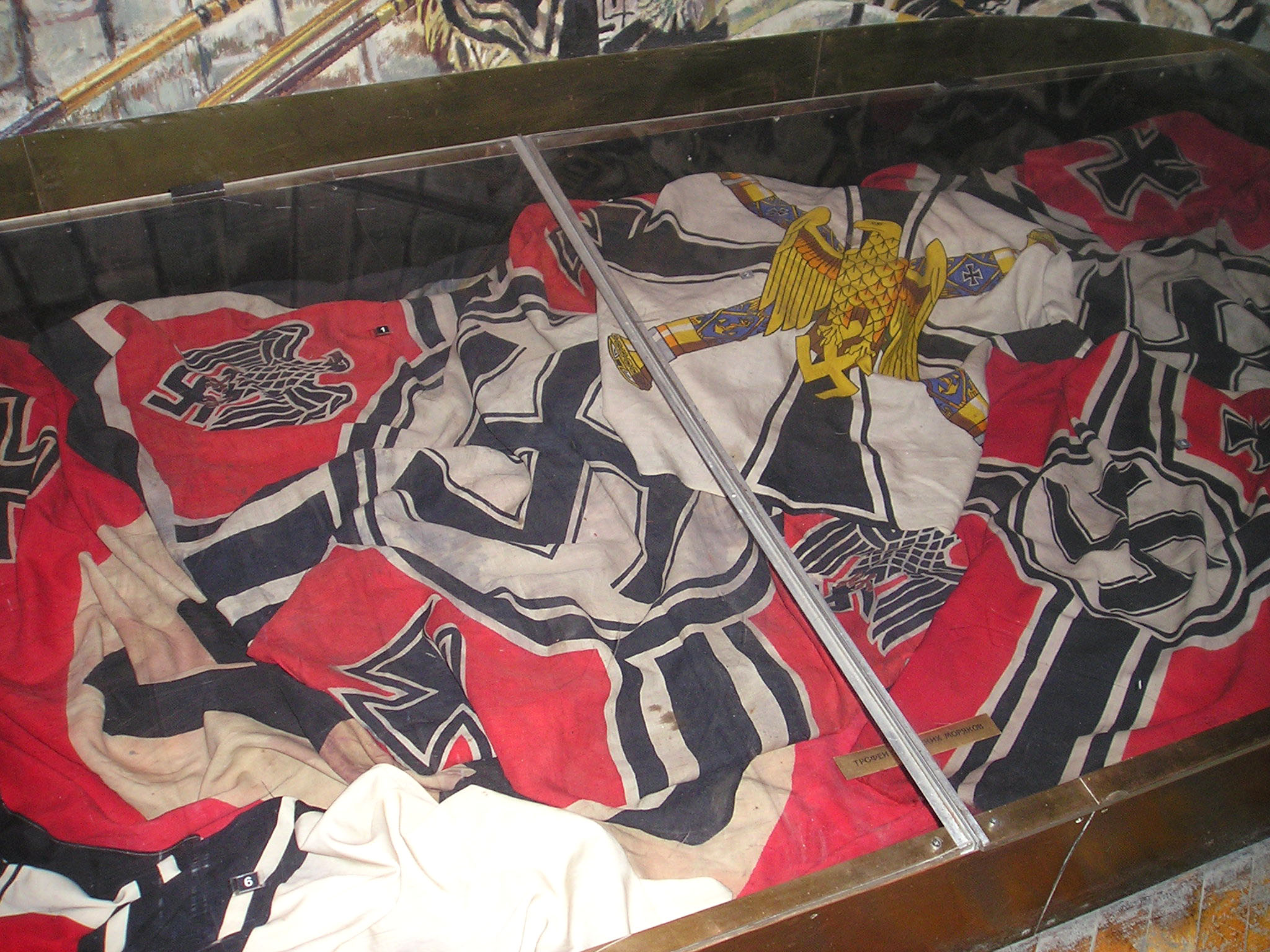
Flags of Nazi Germany, captured by the Soviet troops

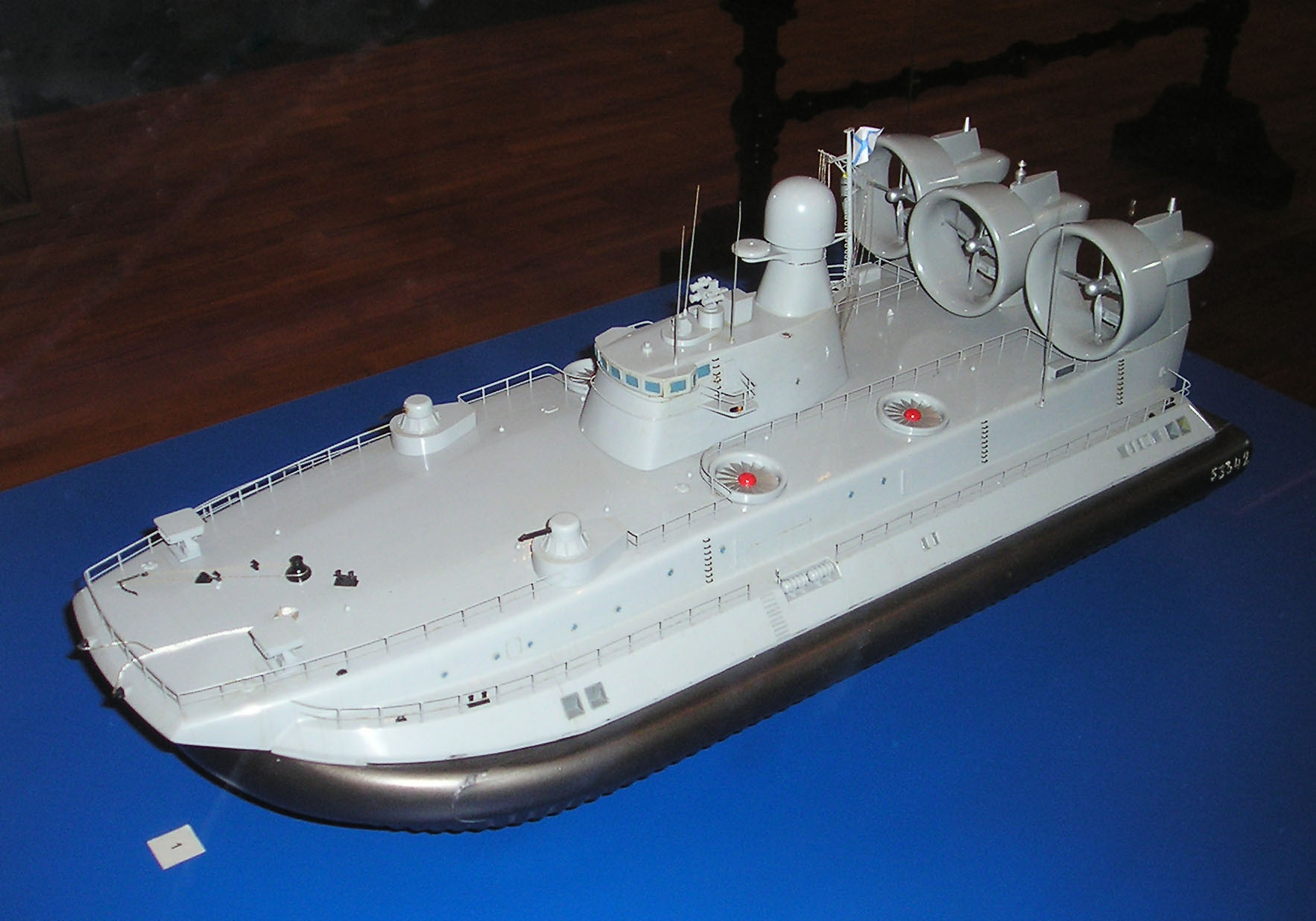
Hovercraft model

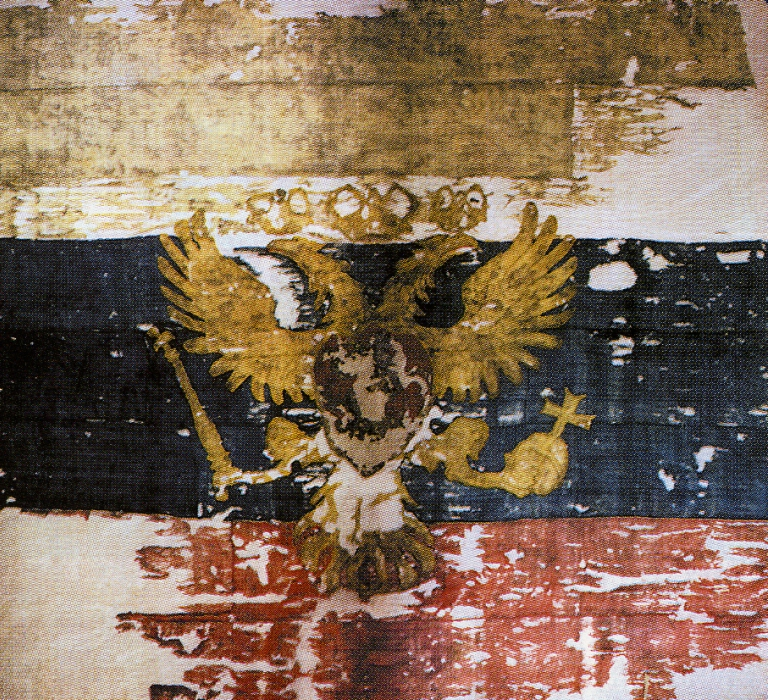
1693 flag of Tsar of Russia, the oldest surviving Russian flag.

== See also ==
- List of museums in Saint Petersburg
