= Saint Petersburg Commodity and Stock Exchange =

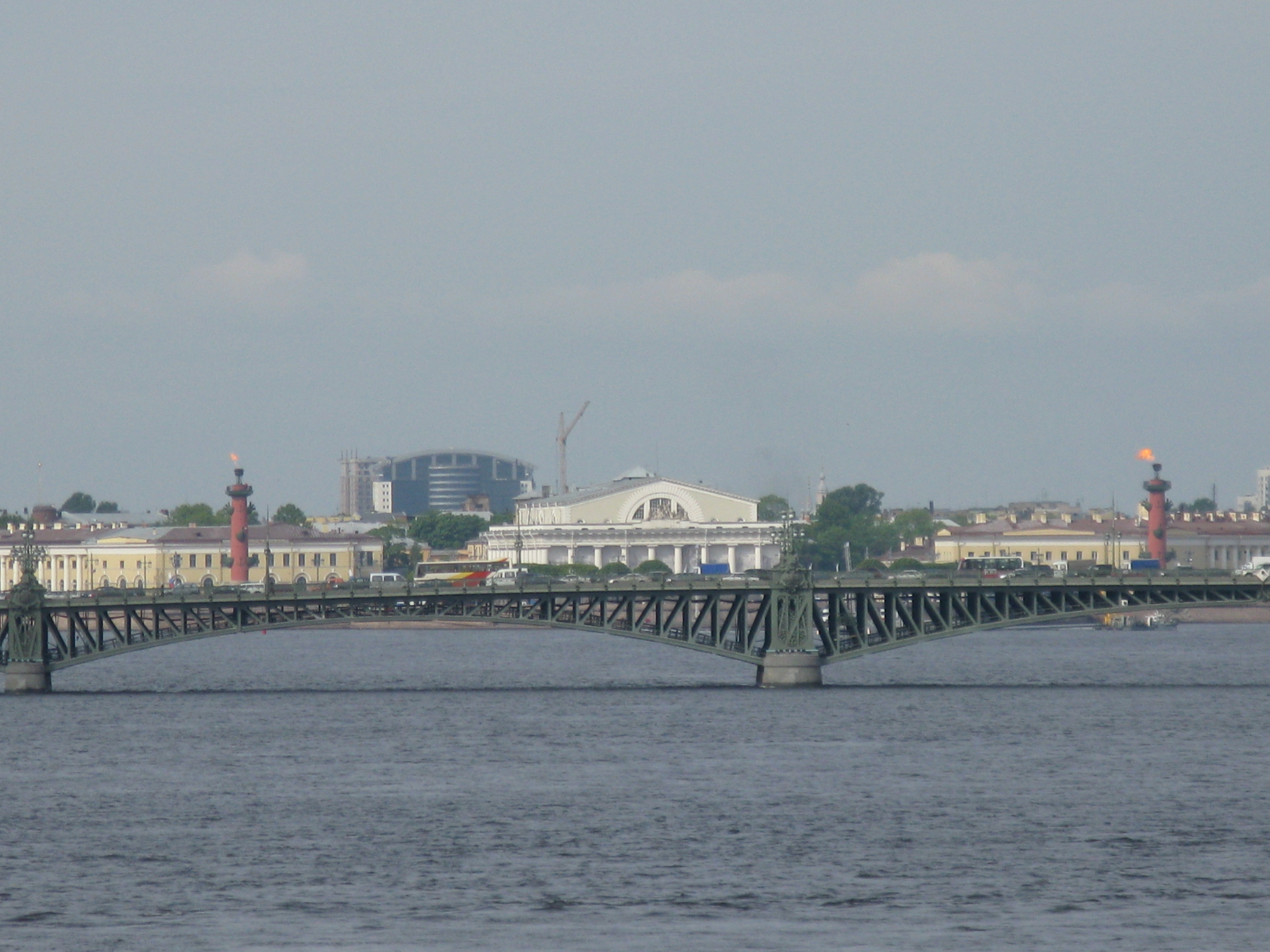
Spit of Vasilievsky Island

The Saint Petersburg Commodity and Stock Exchange is based in a housing complex in Saint Petersburg, Russia. Its offices along with the residential buildings were constructed in 2007–2008 on Vasilievsky Island near a recreation center.

After the center was built, it was recognized as a town-planning error. The government of Saint Petersburg required the builder to reduce the number of floors. The modifications were supervised by the vice-governor of Saint Petersburg, Roman Filimonov. Work on the height reduction to 54 metres was originally planned to be finished by August, 2009, but on August 3 the requirements were extended to the end of that year.
