= Konstantin Thon =

Russian architect (1794–1881)

Konstantin Andreyevich Thon
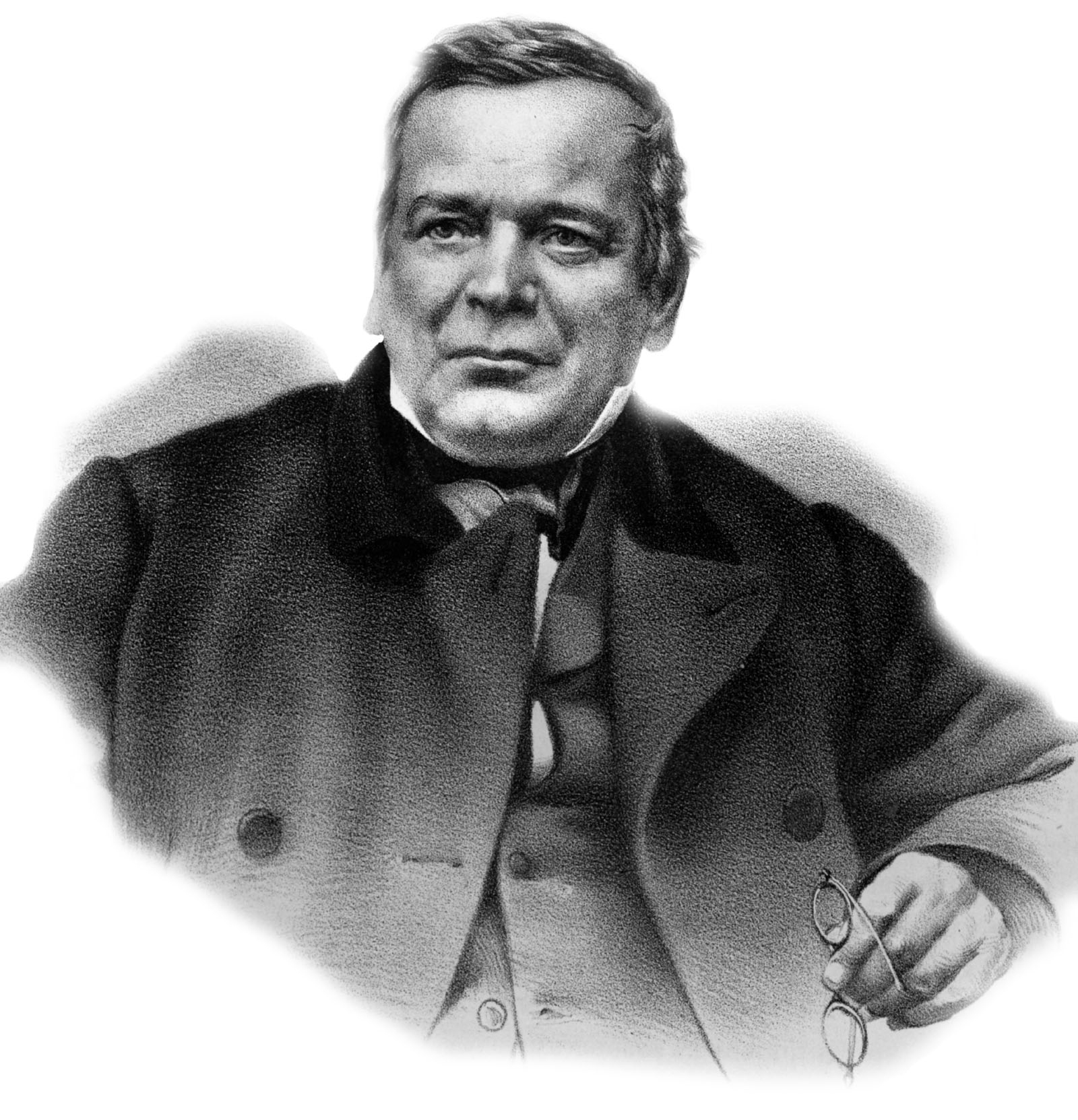
- Lithograph, 1864–1869
- Born: October 26, 1794; Saint Petersburg, Russia
- Died: 25 January 1881 (aged 86); Saint Petersburg, Russia
- Resting place: Volkovo Cemetery, St. Petersburg
- Occupation: Architect
- Buildings: Cathedral of Christ the Saviour

Konstantin Andreyevich Thon or Ton (Russian: Константи́н Андре́евич Тон; October 26, 1794 – January 25, 1881) was a Russian architect who was one of the most notable architects during the reign Nicholas I. His major works include the Cathedral of Christ the Saviour, the Grand Kremlin Palace and the Kremlin Armoury in Moscow.

== Early life ==
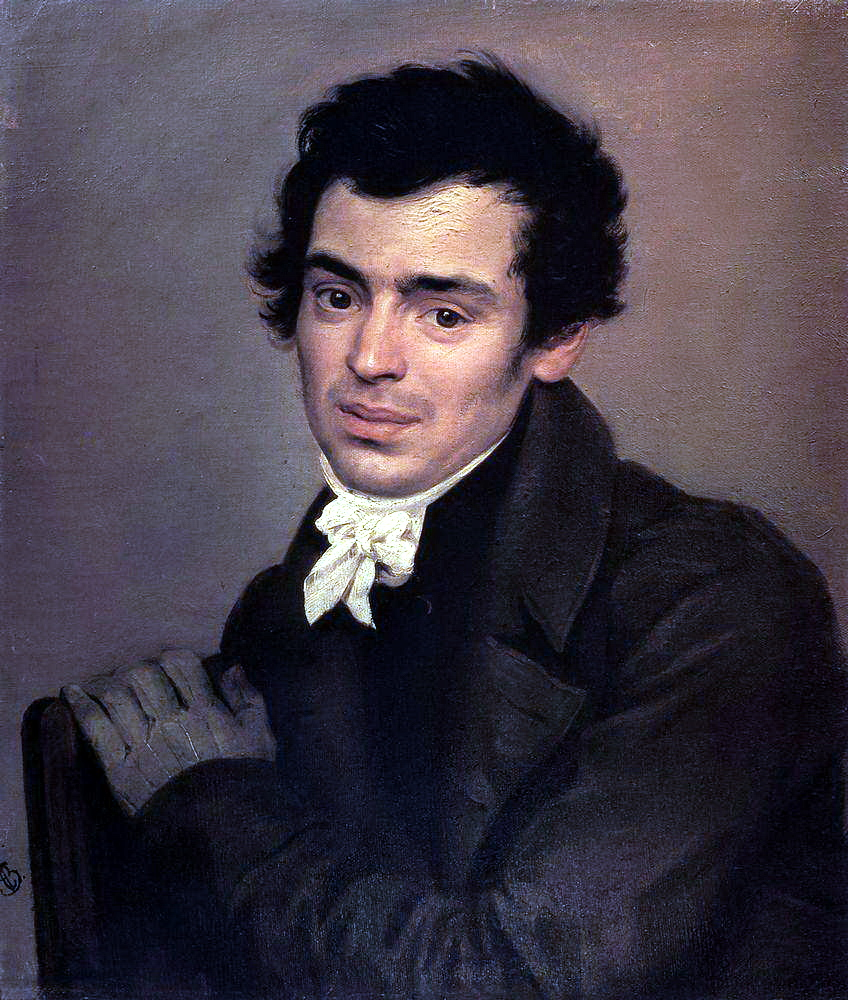
Portrait by Karl Bryullov, 1823

Konstantin, born in St. Petersburg to the family of a German jeweller, was one of three Thon brothers who all rose to become notable architects. He studied at the Imperial Academy of Arts (1803–1815) under the Empire-style architect Andrey Voronikhin, best remembered for his work on the Kazan Cathedral, situated right in the middle of the Nevsky Prospekt. He studied Italian art in Rome from 1819 to 1828, and on his return home was admitted to the academy as its member (1830) and professor (1833). In 1854, he was appointed rector of the architectural division of the academy.

Thon first attracted public attention with his sumptuous design for the interiors of the Academy building on the Neva embankment. In 1827, he submitted to the tsar his project of St. Catherine Church at the Obvodnyi Canal, the first ever design in the Russian Revival style. He presented a design with five domes, the exterior of which resembled the style of the Dormition Cathedrals in Vladimir (1158–1161) and Moscow (1475–1479). Nicholas I, who felt disaffected with the prevailing Neoclassicism of Russian architecture, remarked that "Russians have their own great art traditions and don't need to cringe before Rome". Thon's project was to become a revered model for other churches in St. Petersburg and across Russia.

== Russian-Byzantine Revival ==
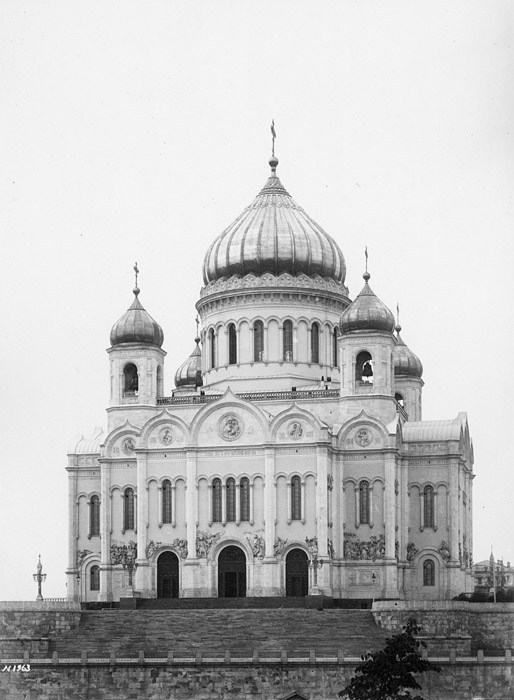
Cathedral of Christ the Saviour in 1902

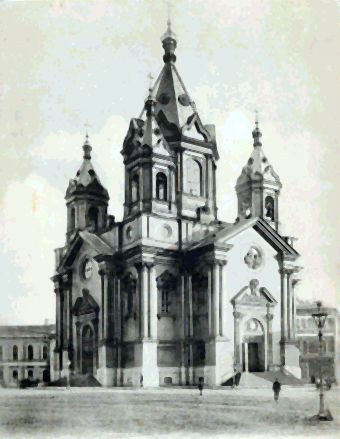
Annunciation Church in St. Petersburg (1843–1849)

In 1830, Thon completed his most ambitious design to date, that of the Cathedral of Christ the Saviour in Moscow. The Russian-Byzantine Revival style of his project, intended to underline similarity of the new church with old cathedrals of the Moscow Kremlin, displeased many of his fellows, who wanted to see the cathedral built in the severe Neoclassical style. Nevertheless, the emperor personally approved his design. Thon and his disciples continued to work on the cathedral for the next 50 years, until the master's death in 1881.

From 1836 to 1842, Thon supervised the construction of another ponderous church with a spacious interior, that of Presentation to the Temple for the Semenovsky regiment in St Petersburg. He followed this with dozens of Neo-Russian-Byzantine designs for churches and cathedrals in provincial towns, including Sveaborg, Yelets, Tomsk, Rostov-on-Don, and Krasnoyarsk. Some of his revivalist projects were assembled in the Model Album for Church Designs (1836).

From 1838 to 1851, Thon was employed in construction of the Neo-Russian Grand Kremlin Palace and the Kremlin Armoury in Moscow. The grandiose palace, famed for opulent interiors of its 700 rooms and halls, was meant to symbolize the grandeur of the Russian state. It was a daring design which incorporated parts of earlier structures that had been standing on the spot. The palace has served successively as an official residence for the Russian tsars, Soviet rulers, and the presidents of the Russian Federation. At the same time, Thon rehabilitated the abandoned Izmaylovo Estate into an almshouse for the veterans of the Napoleonic Wars.

== Later years ==
Thon's last important commissions were the Nikolaevsky railway stations in Moscow and Saint Petersburg (1849–1851). In his design for the stations the architect implemented some of the newest construction technologies. Despite large pieces of steelwork used in the construction, Venetian facades and medieval clock towers of the stations cleverly masked their modern function. Both structures, although extensively reconstructed, are still standing.

After the death of his patron, the Emperor, Thon's failing health prevented him from working on other projects apart from the great cathedral in Moscow. He died at St. Petersburg in 1881.

Even during his lifetime, the more radical of his contemporaries, such as Alexander Herzen, dismissed his architecture as "reactionary manifestation of the tyrant's rule". The Soviet authorities, labelling Thon's churches ugly chests of drawers, systematically destroyed as many of them as possible, including all his churches in St Petersburg and vicinity and the work of his life, the Cathedral of Christ the Saviour. The fall of the Soviet rule in 1991 brought about a renewed interest in the work of the Neo-Russian-Byzantine master.

== Sources ==
- "Тон, Константин Андреевич" . Brockhaus and Efron Encyclopedic Dictionary (in Russian). 1906.
- Cracraft, James; Rowland, Daniel B. (6 August 2018). Architectures of Russian Identity, 1500 to the Present. Cornell University Press. ISBN 978-1-5017-2358-2.
