= Rubtsovo =

Rubtsovo Рубцово
- Village
- Location within Vologda Oblast Location within Russia
- Coordinates: 60°24′N 40°20′E
- Country: Russia
- Region: Vologda Oblast
- District: Vozhegodsky District
- Time zone: UTC+3:00

Rubtsovo (Russian: Рубцово) is a rural locality (a village) in Vozhegodskoye Urban Settlement, Vozhegodsky District, Vologda Oblast, Russia. The population was 4 as of 2002.

== Geography ==
Rubtsovo is located 15 km southeast of Vozhega (the district's administrative centre) by road. Shcheglikha is the nearest rural locality.
