= Old Saint Petersburg Stock Exchange and Rostral Columns =

Russian Stock Exchange Building in Petersburg

Coordinates: 59°56′36″N 30°18′16″E

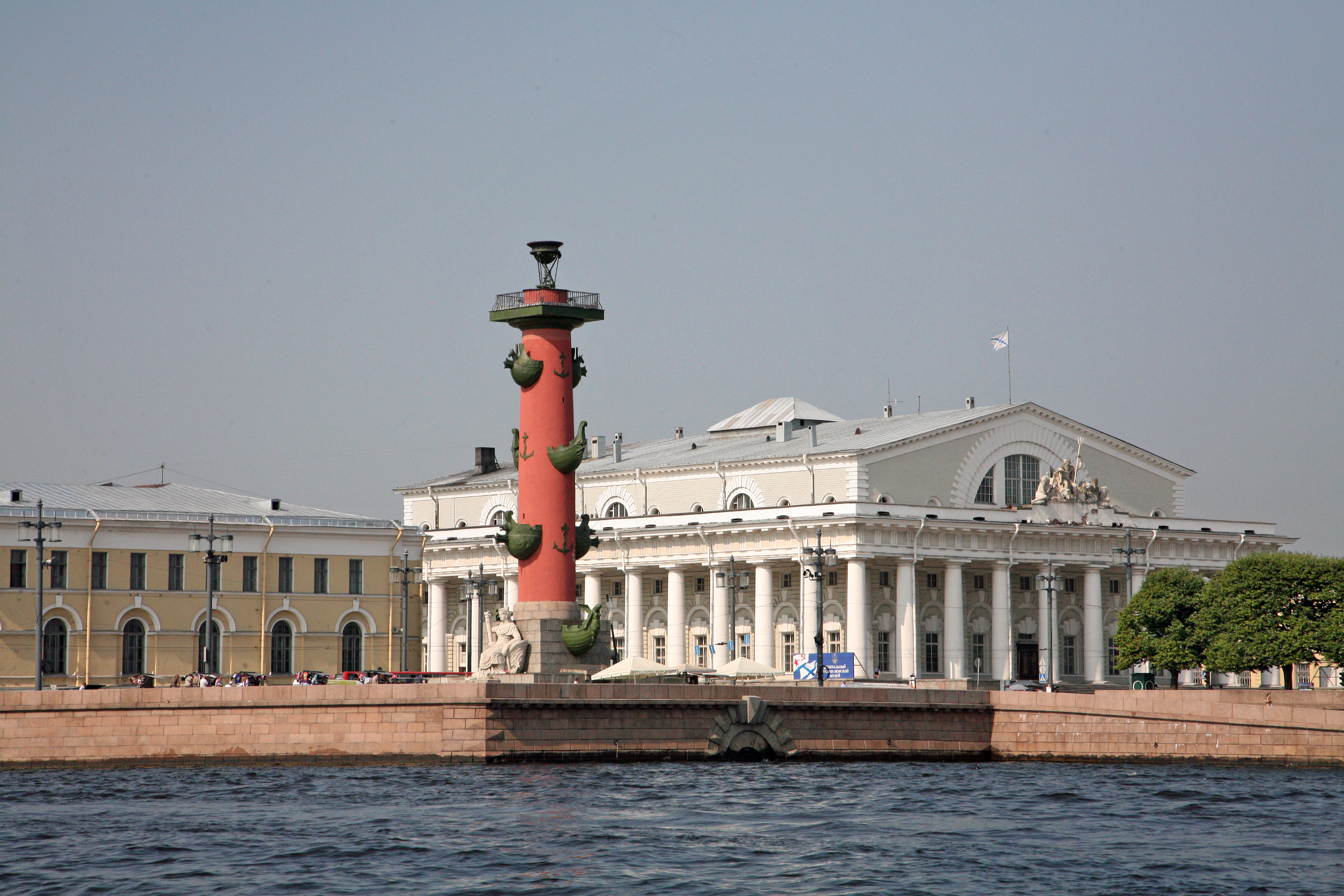
The Old Saint Petersburg Stock Exchange was completed in 1810.

The Old Saint Petersburg Stock Exchange (also Bourse) and Rostral Columns, located in Saint Petersburg in the Russian Federation, are significant examples of Greek Revival architecture. Designed by French architect Thomas de Thomon, and inspired by the Greek Temple of Hera at Paestum, the stock exchange was constructed between 1805 and 1810. The rostral columns erected on either side of the Stock Exchange were completed in 1811. The Old Saint Petersburg Stock Exchange is located at Birzhevaya Ploschad 4.

== Old Stock Exchange ==
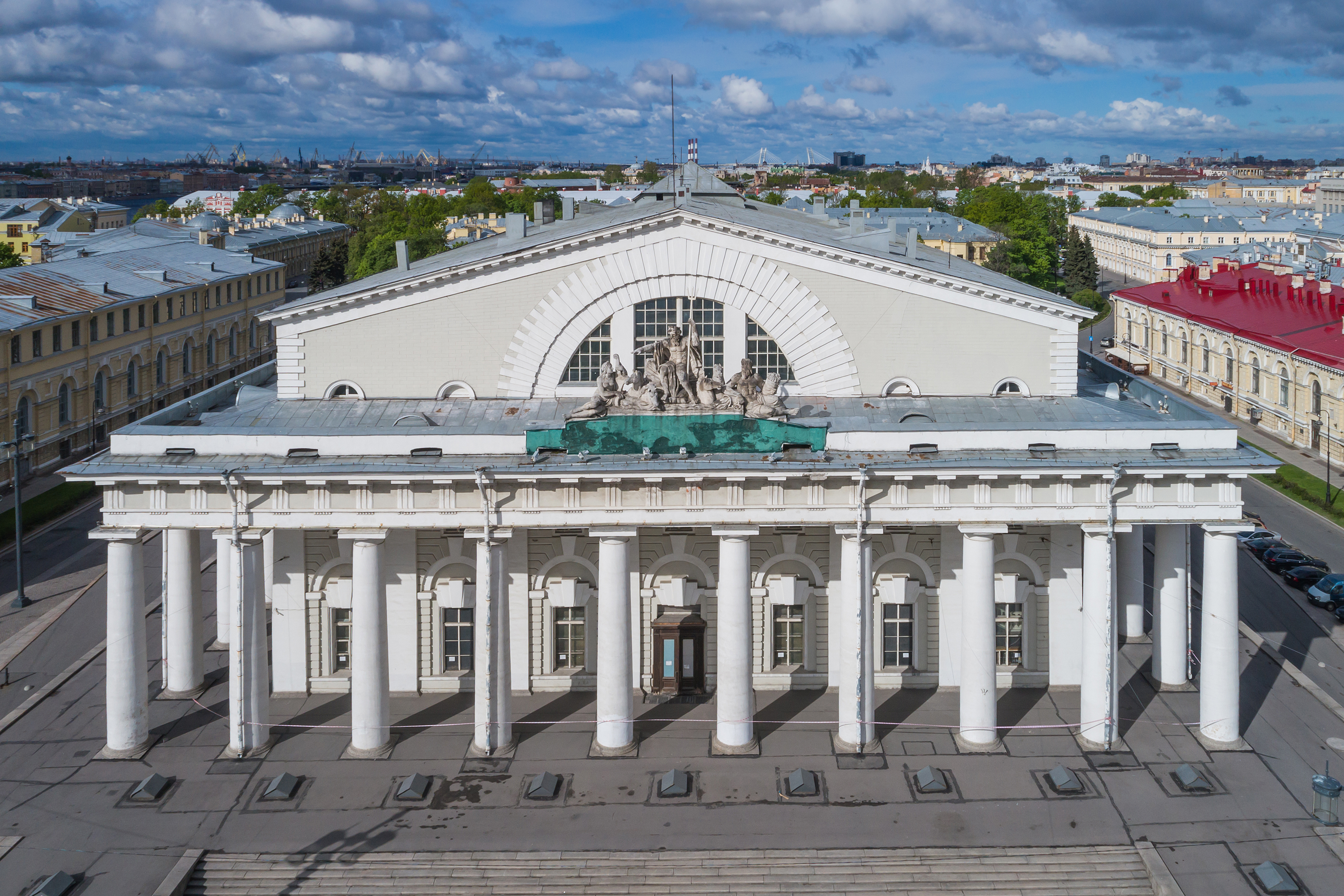
Portico of the Old Saint Petersburg Stock Exchange (Bourse) showing the sculpture of Neptune

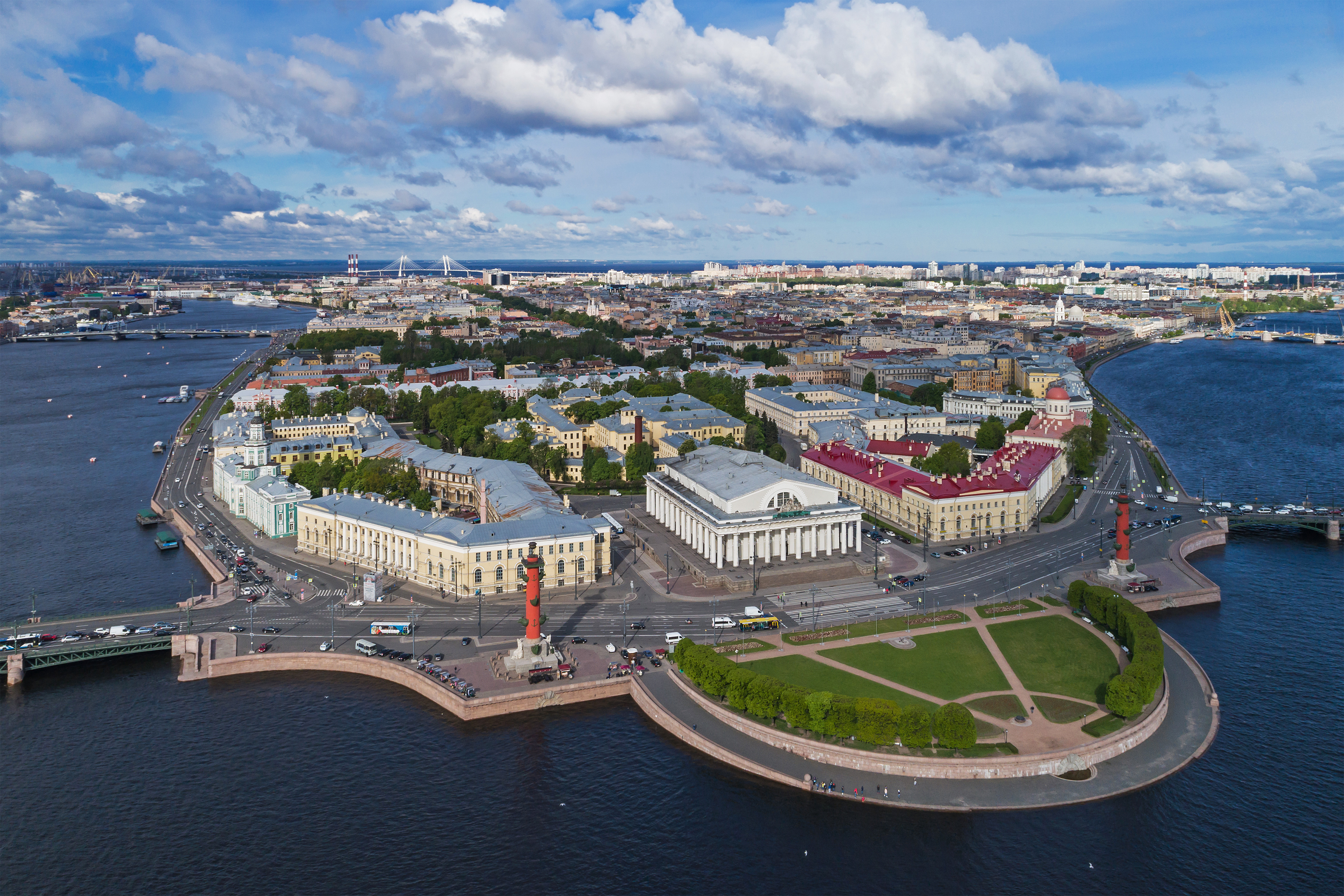
Aerial view of the Old Saint Petersburg Stock Exchange and Rostral Columns

Old Saint Petersburg Stock Exchange (Russian: Здание Биржи, romanized: Zdanie Birzhi) is a historic building in Saint Petersburg, the former location of the city's stock exchange. It is the main building in an architectural complex located on the spit of Vasilyevsky Island. The building, which is situated at Birzhevaya Ploschad 4, is an important example of Greek Revival architecture. Designed by French architect Thomas de Thomon and inspired by the Greek Temple of Hera at Paestum, the stock exchange was constructed between 1805 and 1810. It was built for the St. Petersburg Stock Exchange, but was subsequently used for a different purpose. It housed the Central Naval Museum from 1939 until 2010.

=== Description ===
The Old Stock Exchange is sited to fill the majestic sweep of the Spit (in Russian Strelka) of Vasilievsky Island, just opposite the Winter Palace. Thomon's design called for a peristyle of forty-four Doric columns resting upon a massive stylobate of red granite and supporting an entablature of triglyphs and slotted metopes. A monumental sculptural group similar in form to a quadriga featuring Neptune, and symbolizing maritime commerce, is mounted above the portico. Both inside and outside the Bourse, a motif of the semicircle is recurrent. The interior features a large colonnaded trading hall, now divided into eight exhibition halls. The central rooms are illuminated by an oblong skylight. The surrounding ceiling features double-sunk coffers.

=== History ===
The Stock Exchange was founded by an edict of Peter the Great, ordering the establishment of a stock exchange for his capital city, inspired by the stock exchange in Amsterdam. In 1767 the Committee of City Building decided to develop the vacant space on the spit of Vasilevsky Island, and to create a new home for the St Petersburg stock exchange. The area was developed over six years, from 1783 to 1789, to a design by Giacomo Quarenghi. A range of buildings was constructed on the shores of the Bolshaya Neva River, including the main building of the Academy of Sciences and the concave portion of the northern warehouse (1795–1797). These buildings enclosed the left and right sides of the tip of the spit, the projected location of the Stock Exchange building. Construction of the Stock Exchange building itself began in 1783, but was suspended in 1787.

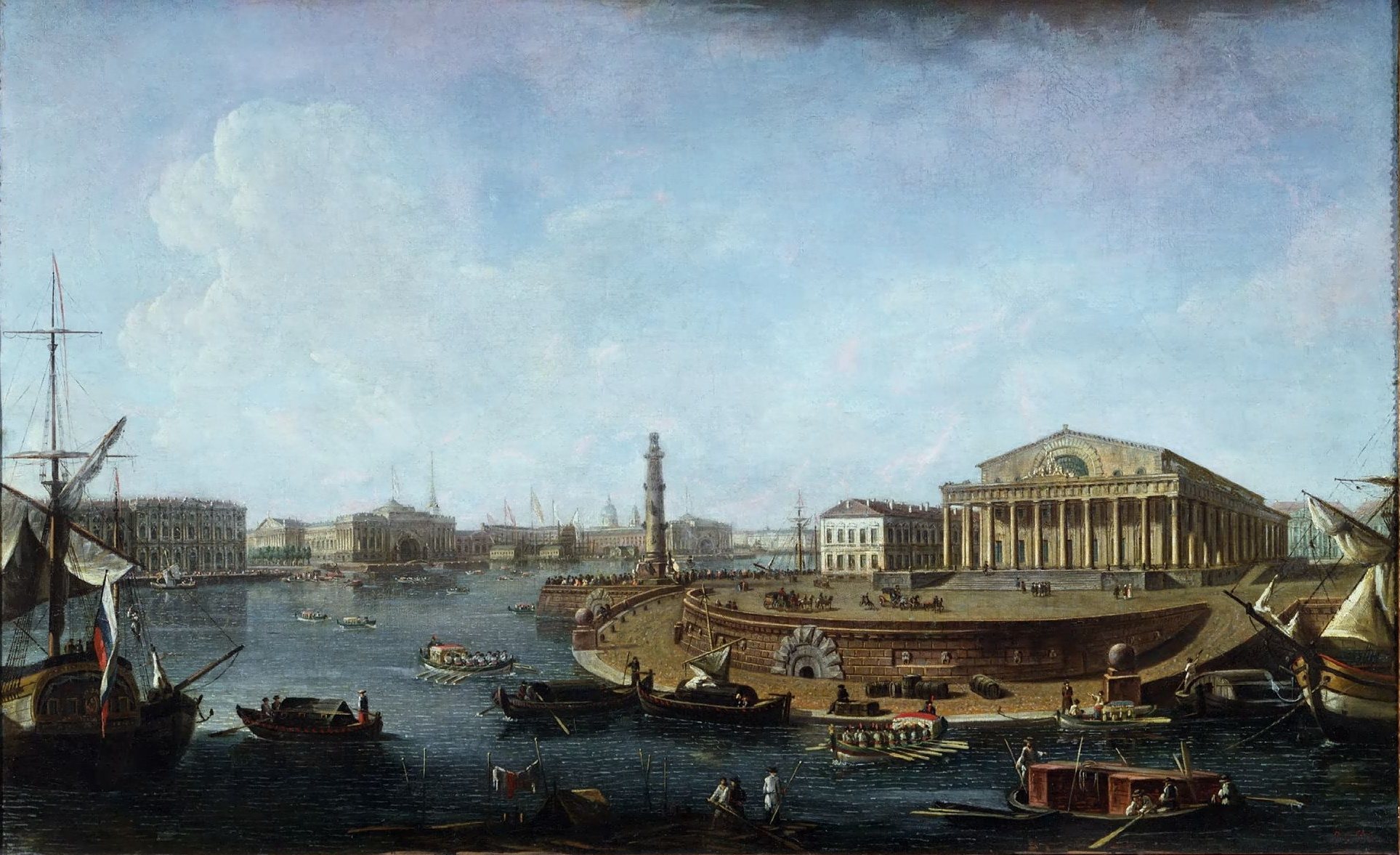
Fyodor Alekseyev, View of the Stock Exchange and Admiralty from the Peter and Paul Fortress, 1810

The project restarted in 1805, overseen by architect Thomas de Thomon, but by 1810 work had again stalled due to the upheavals of the Napoleonic Wars. The architectural ensemble was completed between 1826 and 1832 with the construction of the southern and northern warehouses and customs buildings to the design of the architect Giovanni Luchini. Decorations for the Stock Exchange were designed by Vasily Demut-Malinovsky, while further work was carried out by Marian Peretyatkovich and Fyodor Lidval between 1913 and 1914, including the fitting of a reinforced concrete arch in the main hall of the Exchange.

=== Use as the Central Naval Museum ===
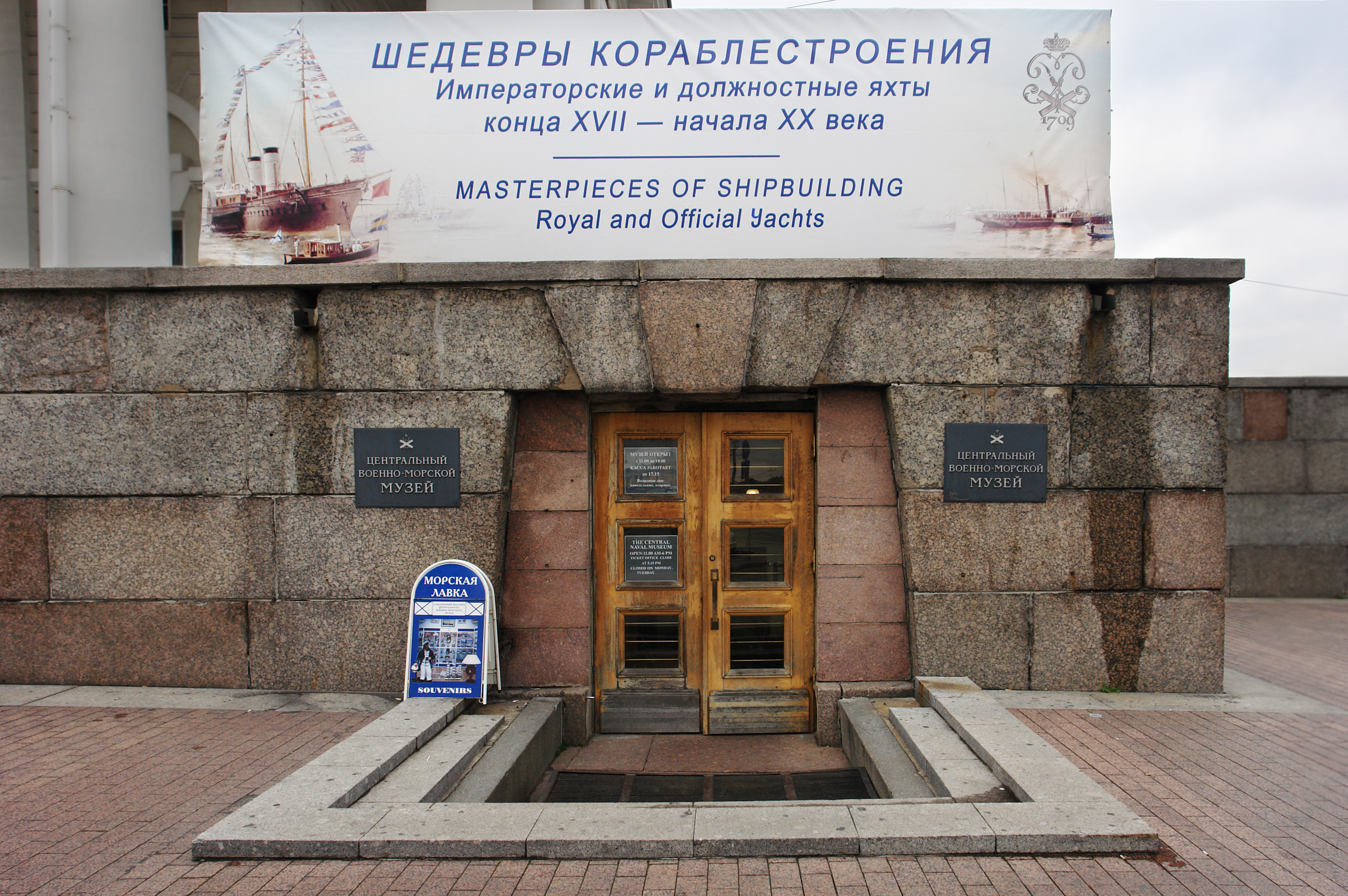
Entrance while the building housed the Central Naval Museum

Following the Russian Revolution in 1917, and the establishment of a Communist economic system and Soviet planning economy, the building ceased to function as a stock exchange. In 1939, it was assigned to house the growing collection of the Central Naval Museum, which traced its founding to Peter the Great's creation of his "Model Chamber" in 1709. During the Soviet period, the collection received many pieces confiscated from private collections.

By 2007, federal authorities were considering moving the naval museum to a new location and to find a new use for the exchange building. Options considered were transferring it to the State Hermitage Museum, or returning it to its former use as a centre for commerce. In 2010 work began on moving the naval museum to a new location in the renovated complex “Kryukov (Marine) barracks”, at Ploshchad Truda in the Admiralteysky District of the city. The old stock exchange building was transferred from federal ownership back to the city of St Petersburg in June 2011, and plans were considered to use it for the trading of oil commodities. These plans were eventually abandoned by October 2013 and the municipal authorities began to consider other uses, including as an exhibition hall, a conference hall, or a concert hall. In December 2013 Governor of St Petersburg Georgy Poltavchenko announced that the exchange will be transferred to the State Hermitage Museum. The Hermitage's director, Mikhail Piotrovsky, declared that the building will be used to house the museum's heraldry collection.

== The Rostral Columns ==
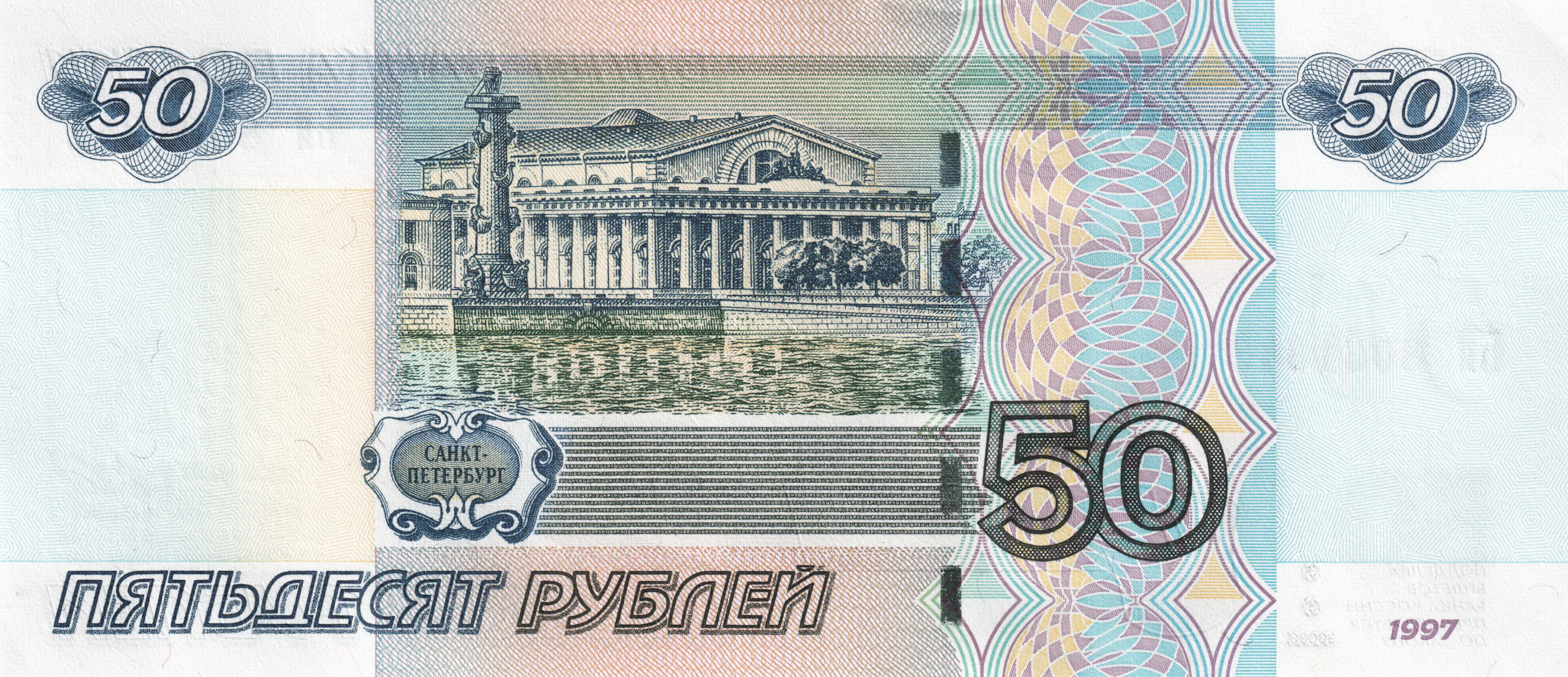
The Stock Exchange and a Rostral Column on a 50-ruble banknote

Opposite the exchange building on the Neva, de Thomon designed a semicircular overlook with circular ramps descending to a jetty projecting into the river. This formal approach, is framed by two rostral columns centered on the portico of the Stock Exchange. The Doric columns sit on a granite plinth and are constructed of brick coated with a deep terra-cotta red stucco and decorated with bronze anchors and four pairs of bronze ship prows (rostra). Seated marble figures decorate the base of each column each representing the major rivers of Russia: the Volga and Dnieper at the northern Rostral Column, Neva and Volkhov at the southern one. The Rostral Columns were originally intended to serve as beacons and originally were topped by a light in the form of a Greek brazier and lit by oil. The braziers have been removed and the tops of the columns refitted with gas torches that continue to be lit on ceremonial occasions.

== Gallery ==
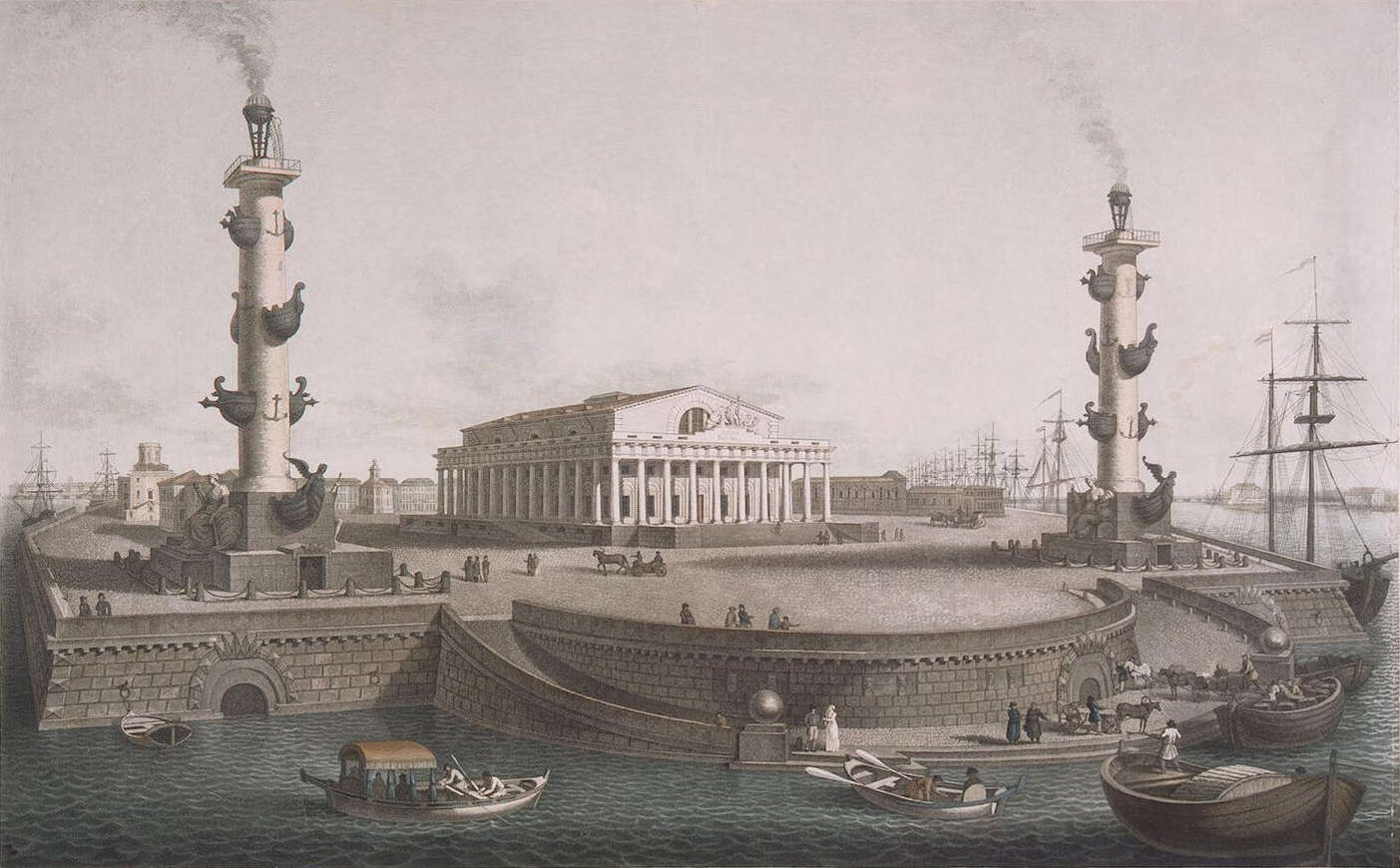
The Old Stock Exchange (Bourse) as seen in an 1817 engraving

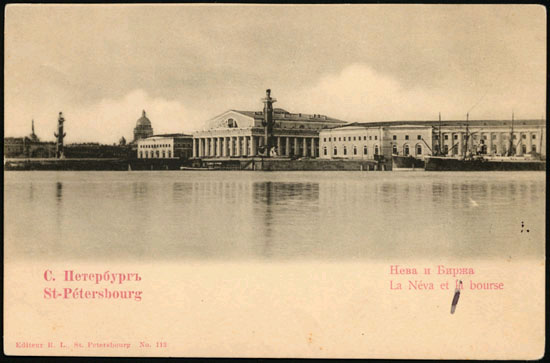
The Old Stock Exchange (Bourse) and the rostral columns in the 1890s

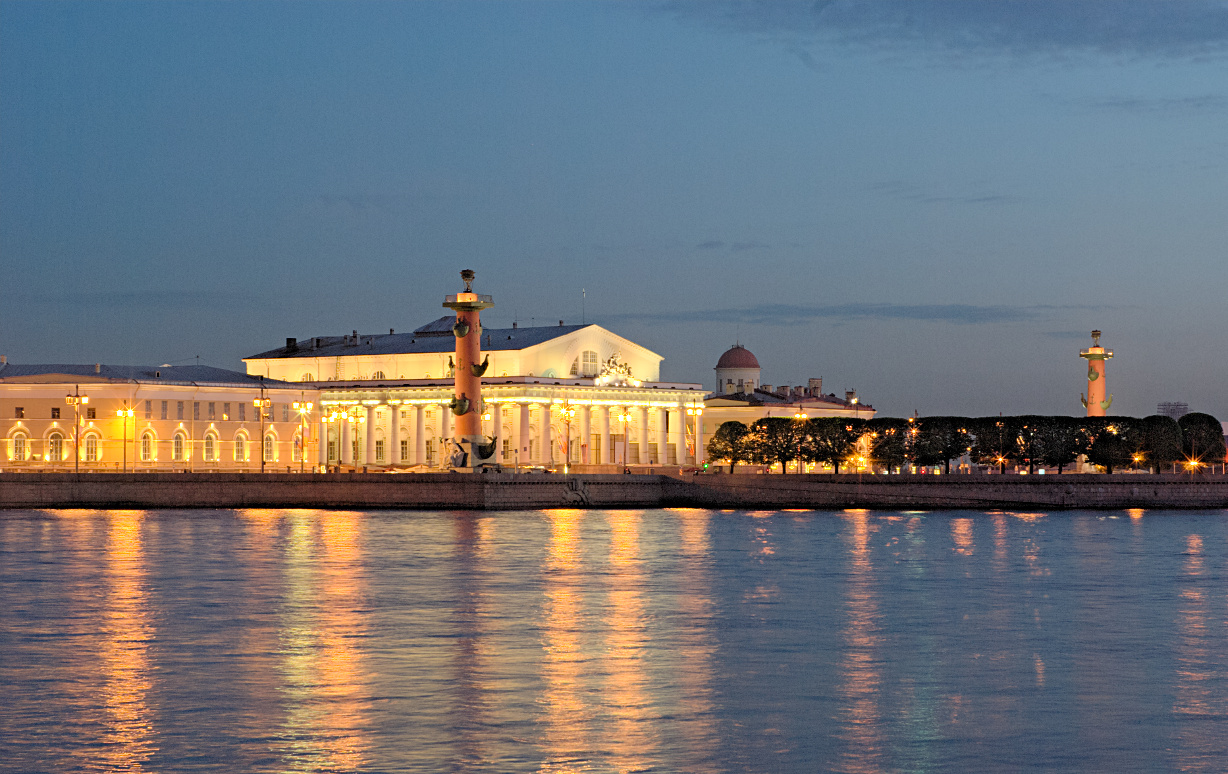
The Bourse during the blue hour

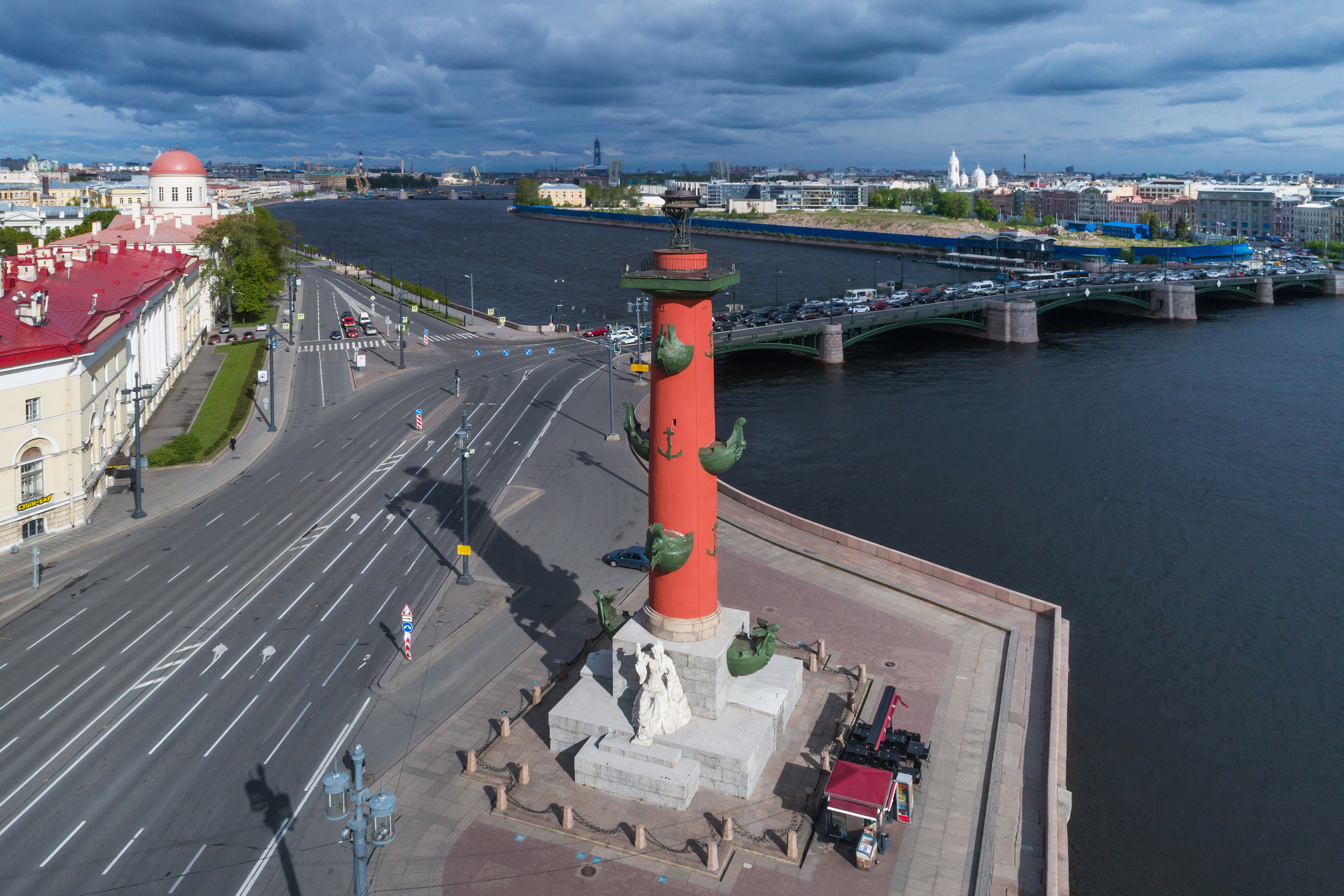
The northern Rostral Column and Birzhevoy Bridge

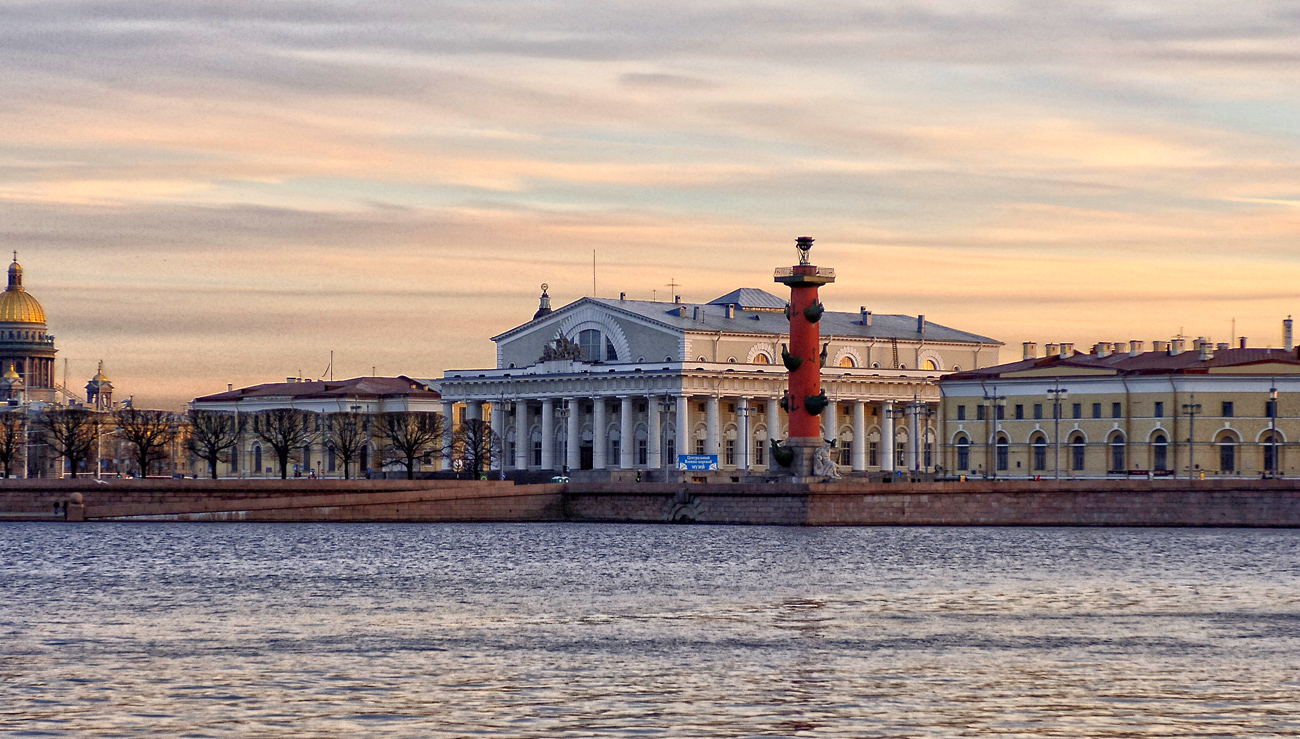
Old Saint Petersburg Stock Exchange

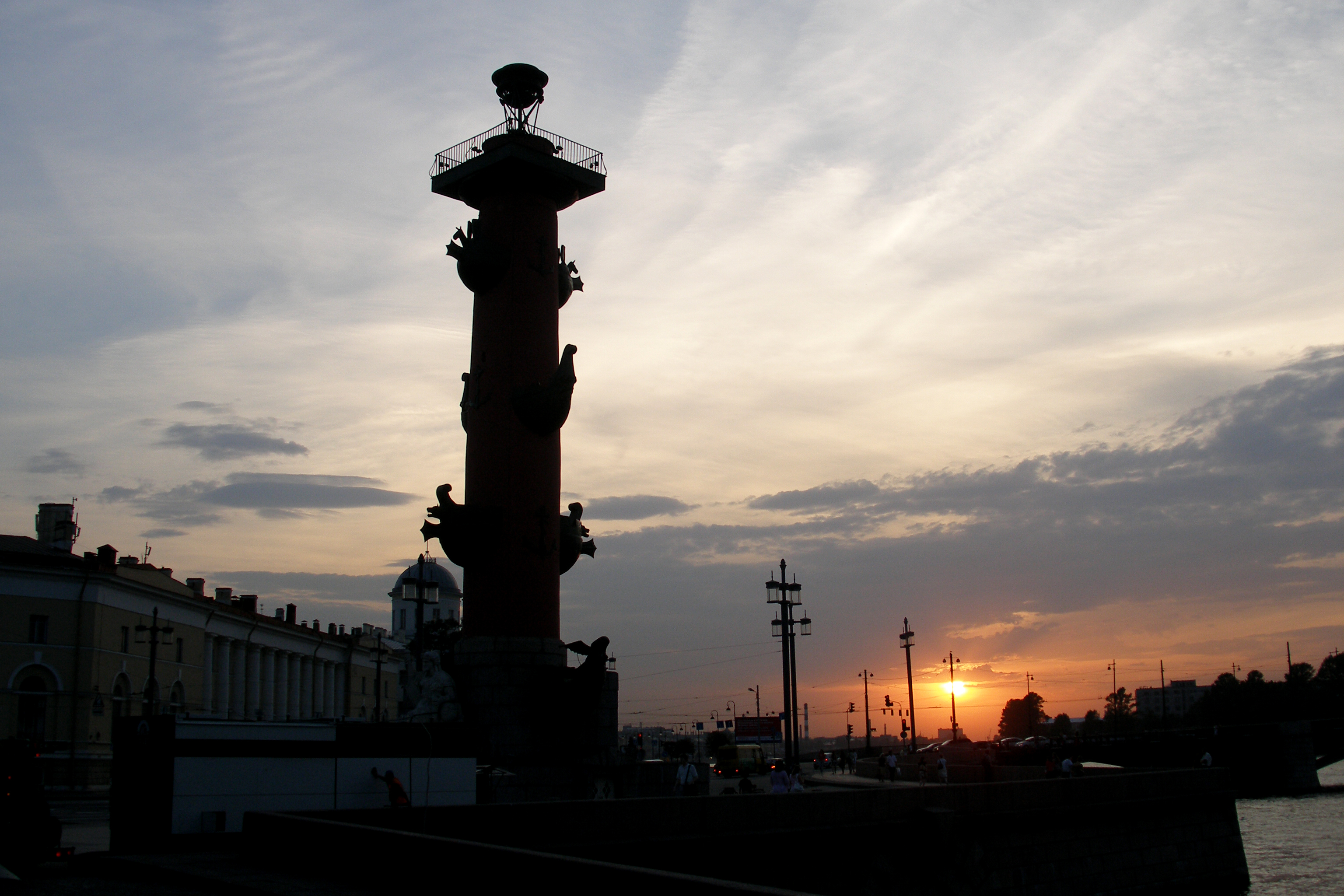
Columns at sunset

== Bibliography ==
- Бунин М. С. Стрелка Васильевского острова: История формирования архитектурного ансамбля. М.; Л., 1958.
- Канн П. Я. Стрелка Васильевского острова. Л., 1973.
