= Outline of Saint Petersburg =

Overview of and topical guide to Saint Petersburg

Flag of Saint Petersburg

Coat of arms of Saint Petersburg

Saint Petersburg is the second-largest city in Russia. An important Russian port on the Baltic Sea, it has the status of a federal subject (a federal city). Its name was changed to "Petrograd" in 1914, then to "Leningrad" in 1924, and back to Saint Petersburg in 1991.

== General reference ==
- Pronunciation: (Russian: Санкт-Петербу́рг, romanized: Sankt-Peterburg, IPA: [ˈsankt pʲɪtʲɪrˈburk]);
- Common English name(s): Saint Petersburg
- Official English name(s): Saint Petersburg
- Adjectival(s): Saint Petersburgian
- Demonym(s): Saint Petersburgian, (Saint) Petersburger

== Geography of Saint Petersburg ==
Geography of Saint Petersburg

- Saint Petersburg is:
  - a city
  - a federal city
- Population of Saint Petersburg: 5,323,300
- Area of Saint Petersburg: 1,439 km^{2} (556 sq mi)
- Atlas of Saint Petersburg

Saint Petersburg Санкт-Петербург
- Location within Russia
- Coordinates: 59°57′N 30°18′E

=== Location of Saint Petersburg ===
- Saint Petersburg is situated within the following regions:
  - Northern Hemisphere and Eastern Hemisphere
    - Eurasia
      - Europe (outline)
        - Eastern Europe
          - Russia (outline)
            - Northwestern Federal District
- Time zone(s): Moscow Time (UTC+03)

=== Environment of Saint Petersburg ===
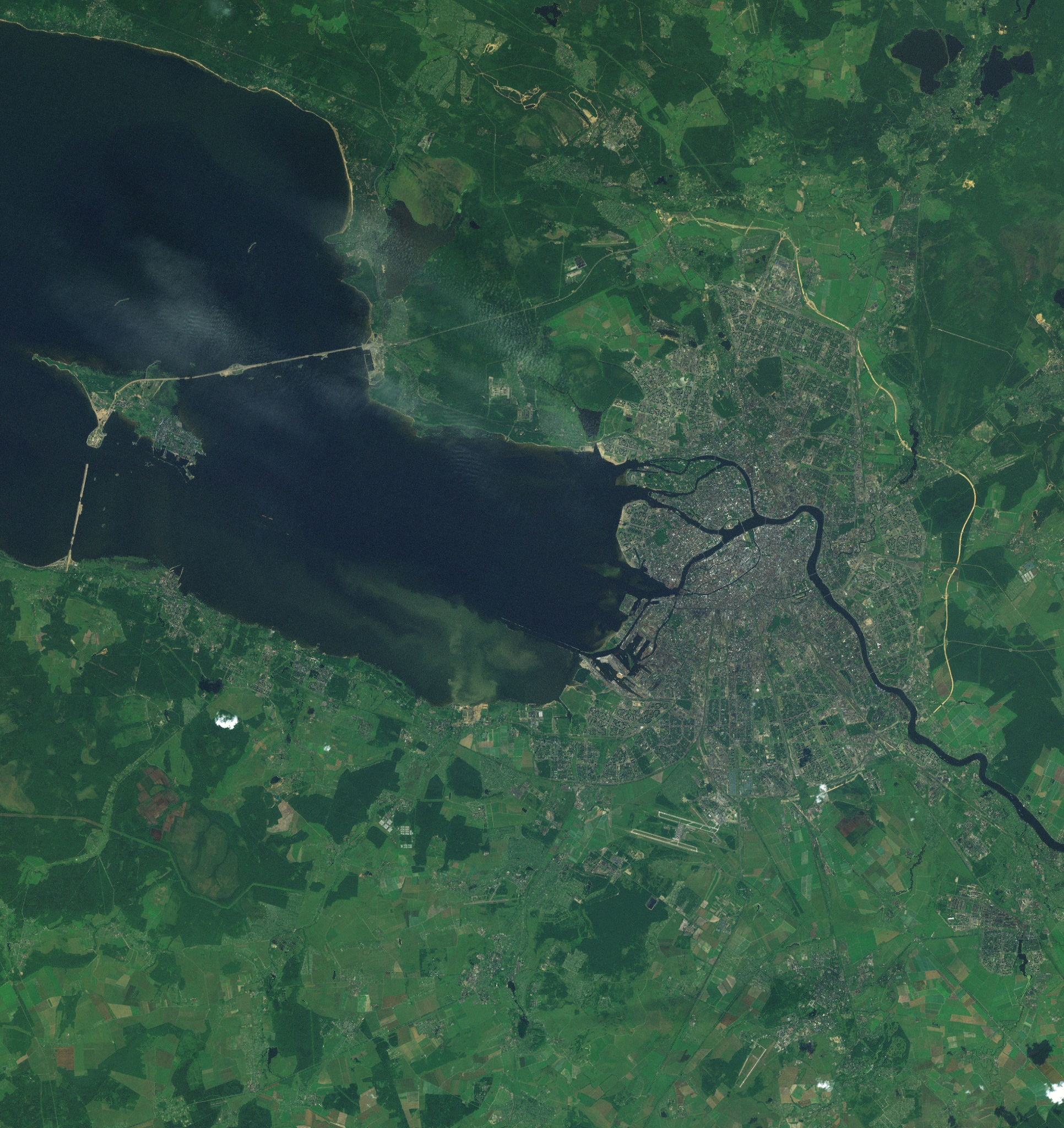
Satellite picture of St. Petersburg

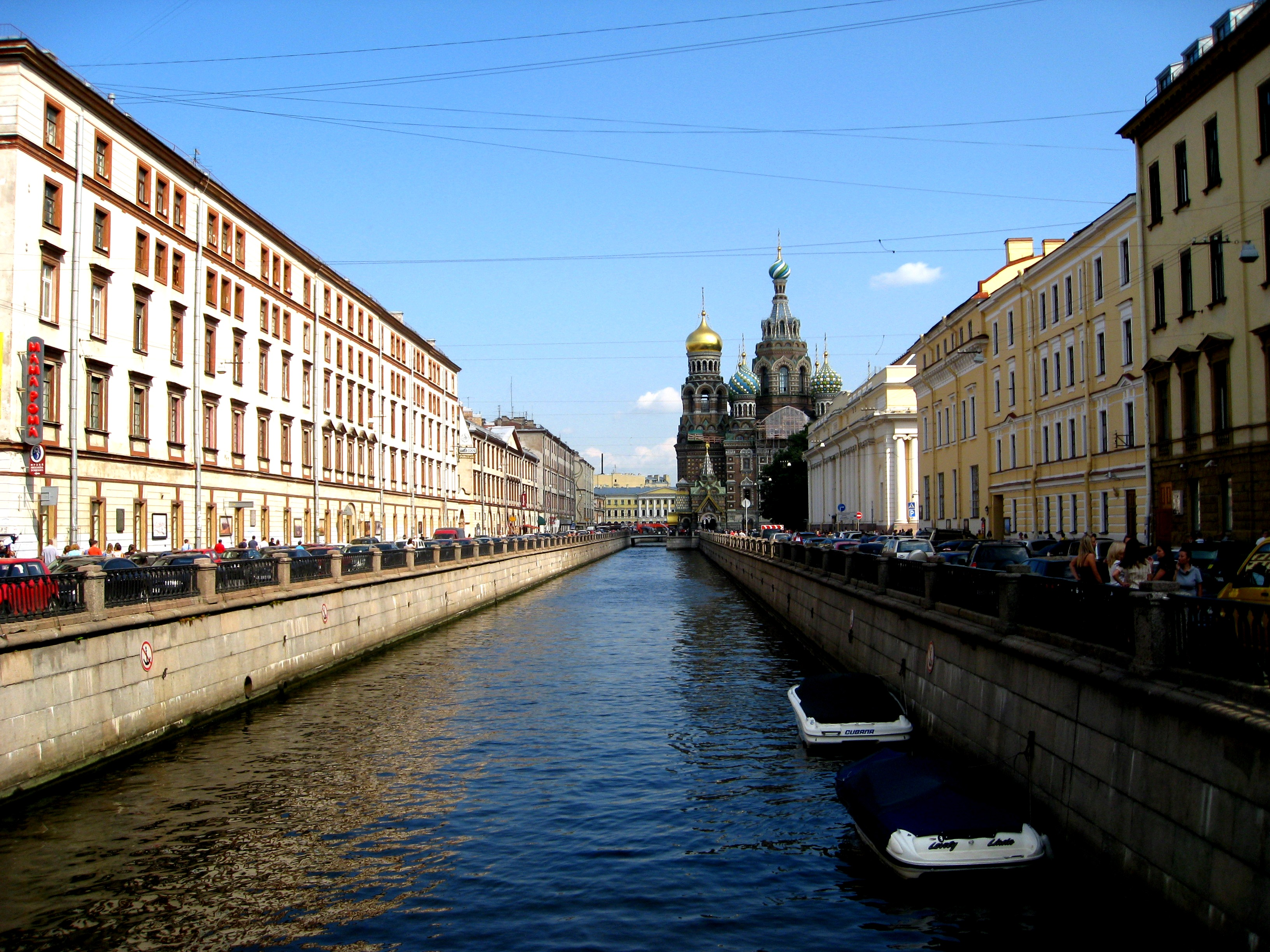
The Griboyedov Canal

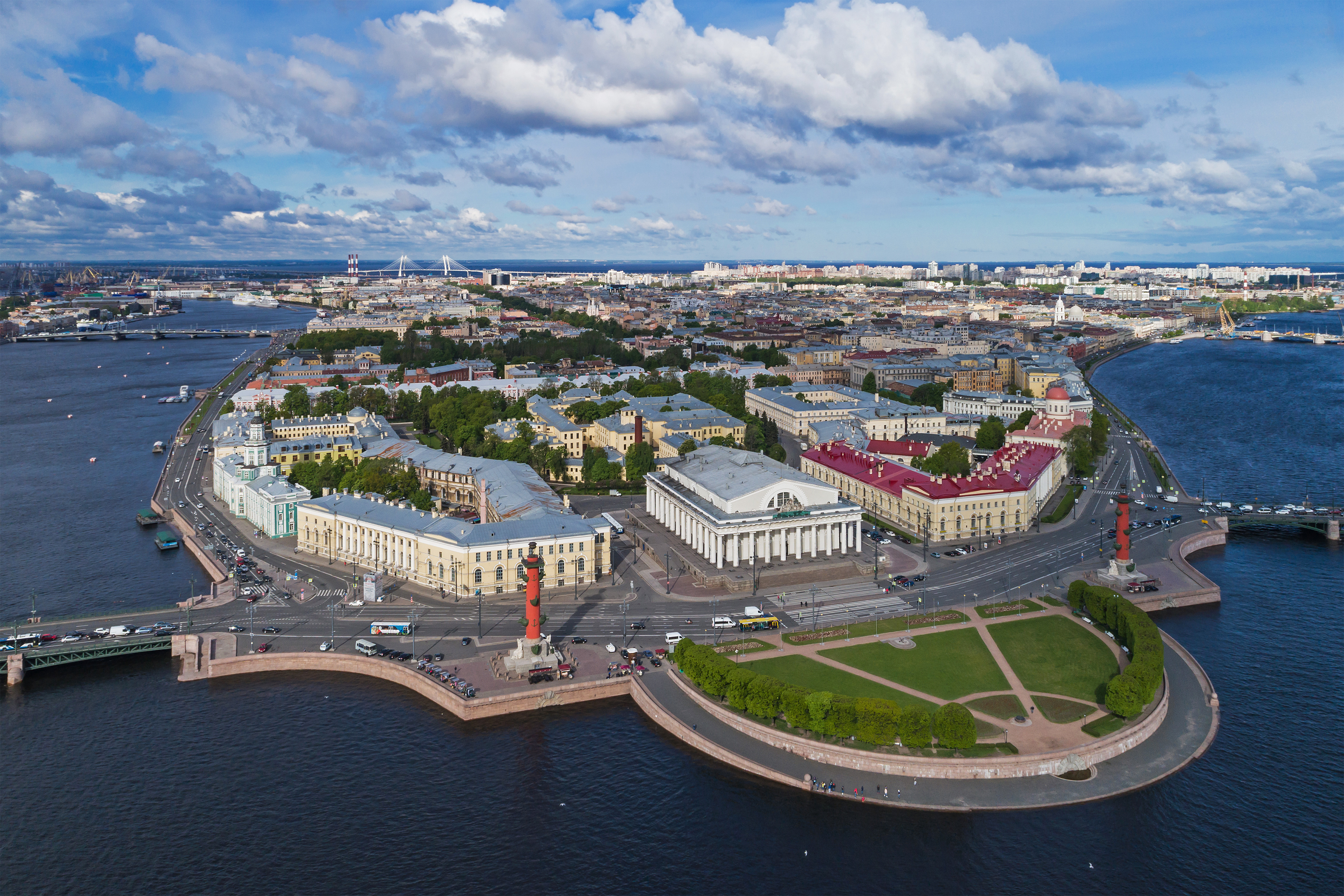
Aerial view of the Vasilyevsky Island

Districts of St. Petersburg: 1. Admiralteysky 2. Vasileostrovsky 3. Vyborgsky 4. Kalininsky 5. Kirovsky 6. Kolpinsky 7. Krasnogvardeysky 8. Krasnoselsky 9. Kronshtadtsky 10. Kurortny 11. Moskovsky 12. Nevsky 13. Petrogradsky 14. Petrodvortsovy 15. Primorsky 16. Pushkinsky 17. Frunzensky 18. Tsentralny

- Climate of Saint Petersburg

==== Natural geographic features of Saint Petersburg ====
- Canals in Saint Petersburg
  - Griboyedov Canal
  - Ligovsky Canal
  - Obvodny Canal
  - Winter Canal
- Hills in Saint Petersburg
  - Duderhof Heights
  - Pulkovo Heights
- Islands in Saint Petersburg
  - Aptekarsky Island
  - Dekabristov Island
  - Hare Island
  - Kamenny Islands
    - Krestovsky Island
    - Yelagin Island
  - Kotlin Island
  - New Holland Island
  - Petrogradsky Island
  - Vasilyevsky Island
- Lakes in Saint Petersburg
  - Lakhtinsky Razliv
  - Ligovsky Pond
- Rivers in Saint Petersburg
  - Izhora River
  - Karpovka River
  - Moyka River
  - Neva River
    - Bolshaya Neva River
    - Bolshaya Nevka River
    - Fontanka River
    - Malaya Neva
  - Okhta River
  - Sestra River

=== Areas of Saint Petersburg ===
Districts of Saint Petersburg

- Central Saint Petersburg

=== Locations in Saint Petersburg ===
- Tourist attractions in Saint Petersburg
  - Museums in Saint Petersburg
  - Shopping areas and markets
  - World Heritage Sites in Saint Petersburg
    - Historic Centre of Saint Petersburg and Related Groups of Monuments

==== Bridges in Saint Petersburg ====
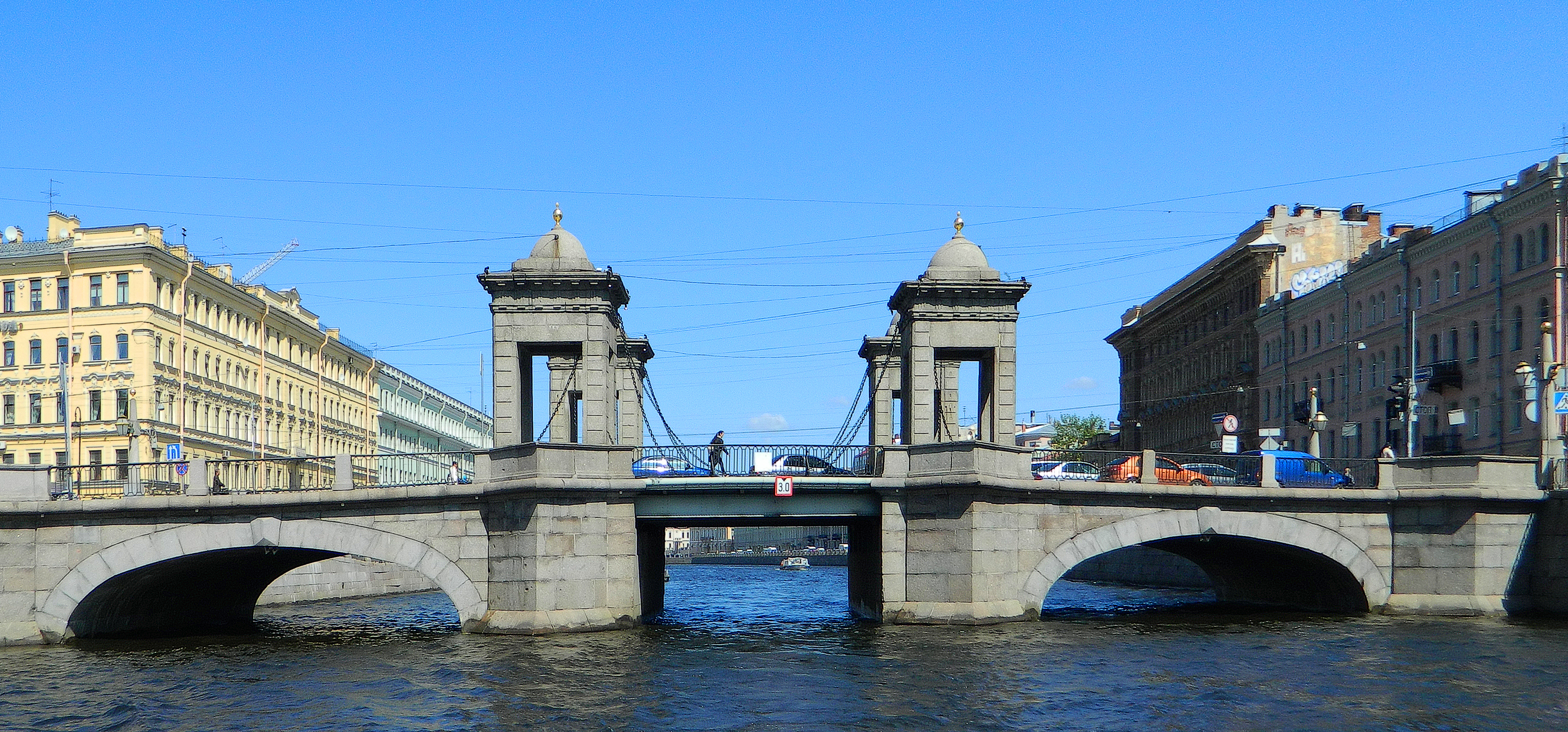
The Lomonosov Bridge

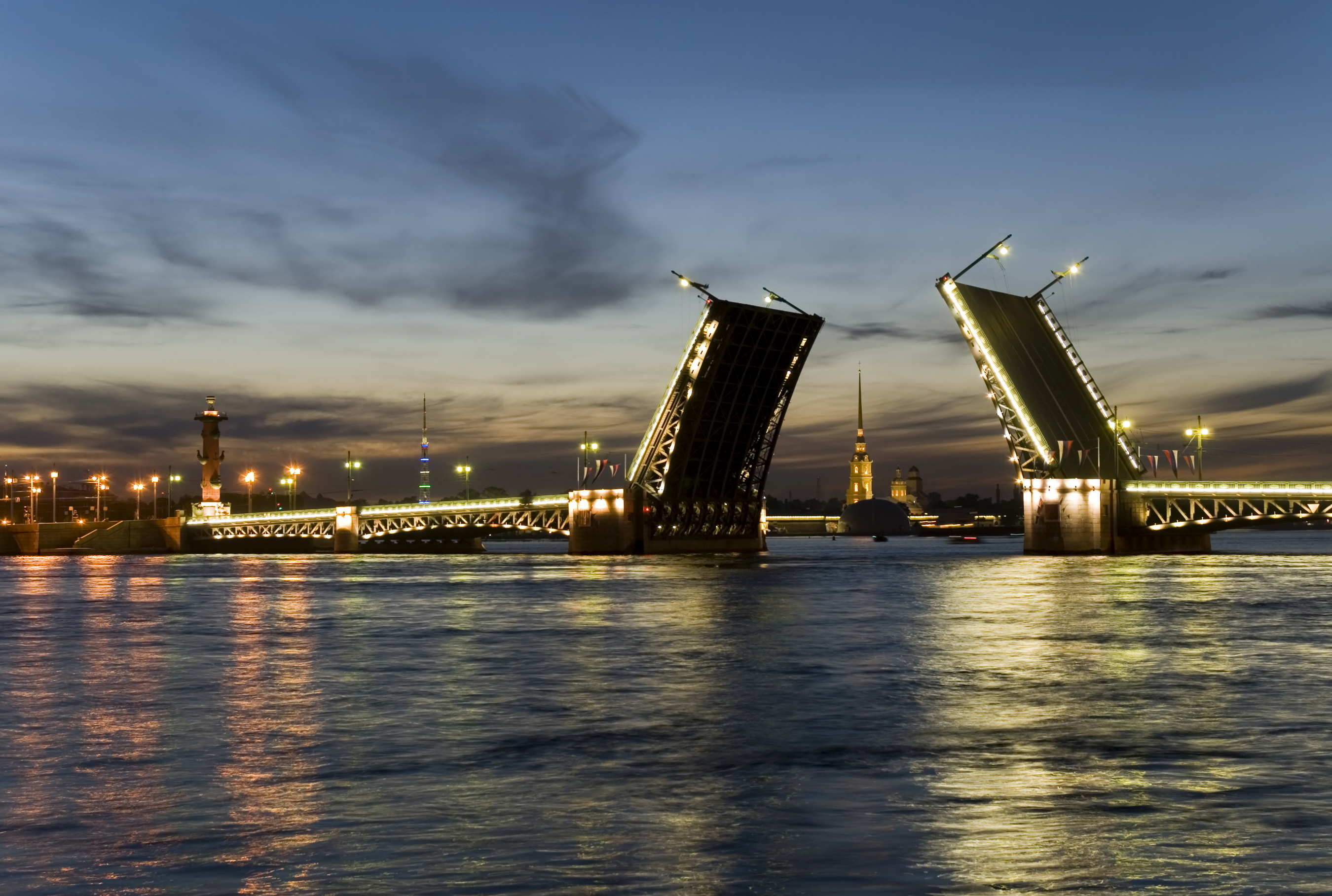
The Palace Bridge

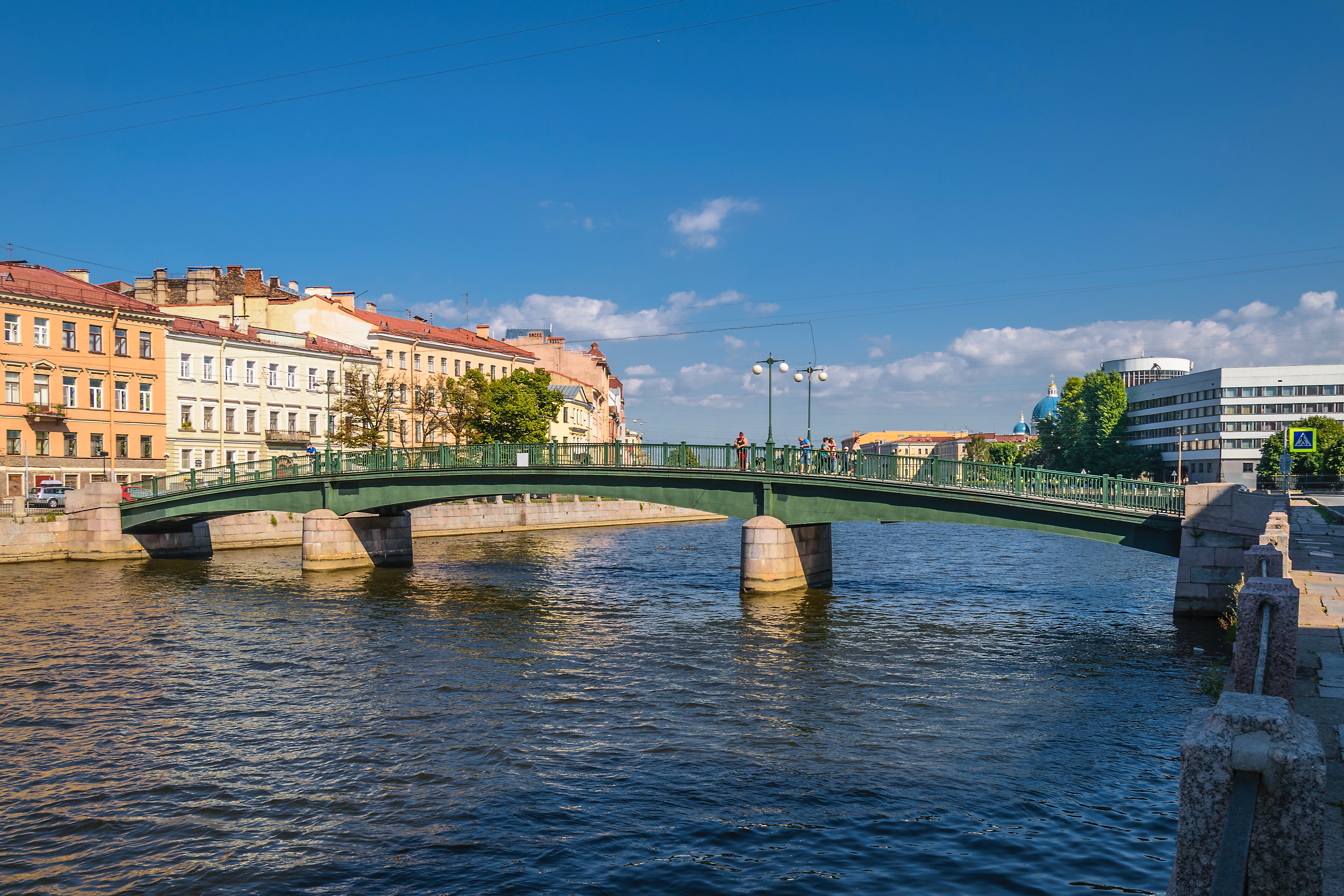
The English Bridge

Bridges in Saint Petersburg

- Anichkov Bridge
- Bank Bridge
- Bolsheokhtinsky Bridge
- Bolshoy Obukhovsky Bridge
- Bridge of Four Lions
- Egyptian Bridge
- English Bridge
- Exchange Bridge
- Finland Railway Bridge
- Hermitage Bridge
- Italian Bridge
- Lazarevskiy Bridge
- Lomonosov Bridge
- Marble Bridge
- Palace Bridge
- Saint Petersburg Dam
  - Floods in Saint Petersburg
- Trinity Bridge

==== Cultural and exhibition centers in Saint Petersburg ====
- Kuryokhin Center
- Saint Petersburg Manege

==== Forts of Saint Petersburg ====
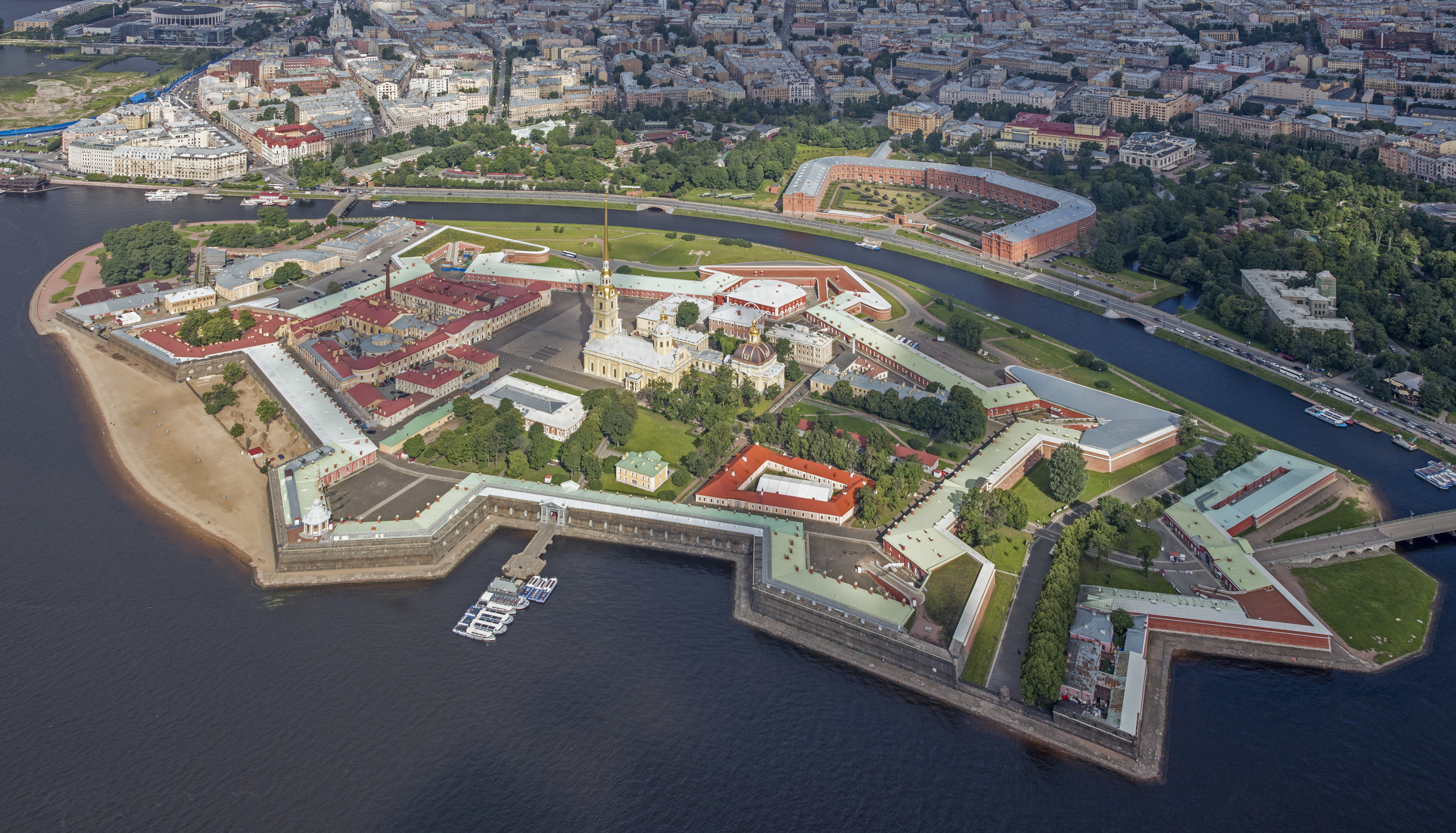
Aerial view of Peter and Paul Fortress

- Fort Alexander
- Peter and Paul Fortress
  - Grand Ducal Burial Vault
  - Saints Peter and Paul Cathedral
  - Saint Petersburg Mint

==== Monuments and memorials in Saint Petersburg ====
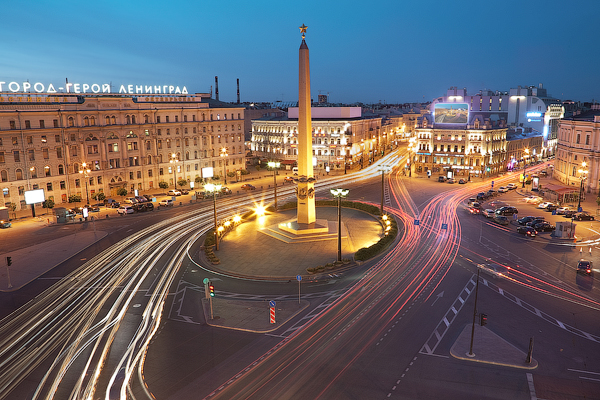
The Leningrad Hero City Obelisk

- Alexander Column
- Bronze Horseman
- Chesme Column
- Column of Glory
- Green Belt of Glory
- Leningrad Hero City Obelisk
- Monument to Nicholas I
- Monument to Peter I (Peter and Paul Fortress)
- Monument to Peter I (St. Michael's Castle)
- Rimsky-Korsakov Monument

==== Museums and art galleries in Saint Petersburg ====
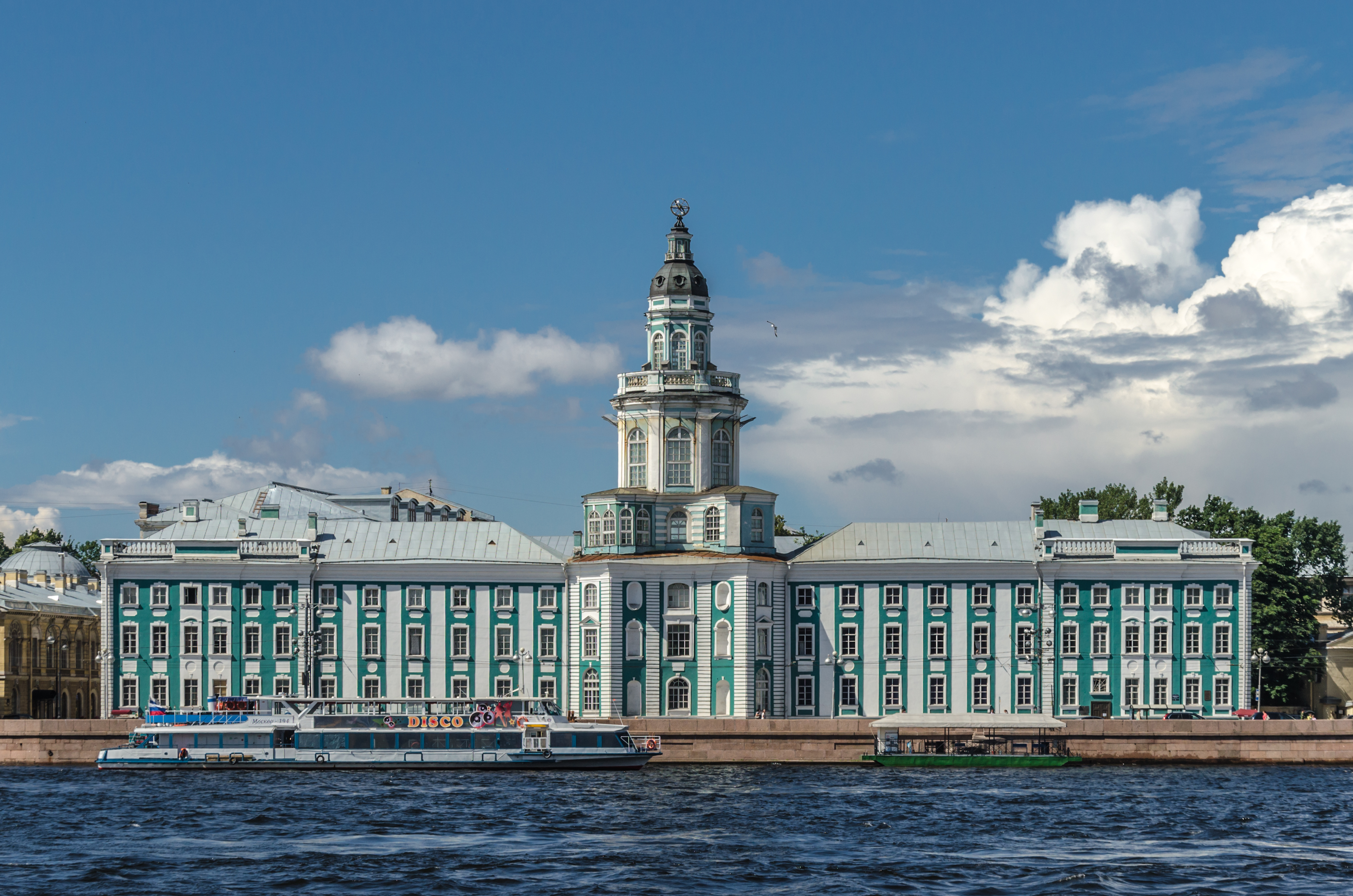
The Kunstkamera

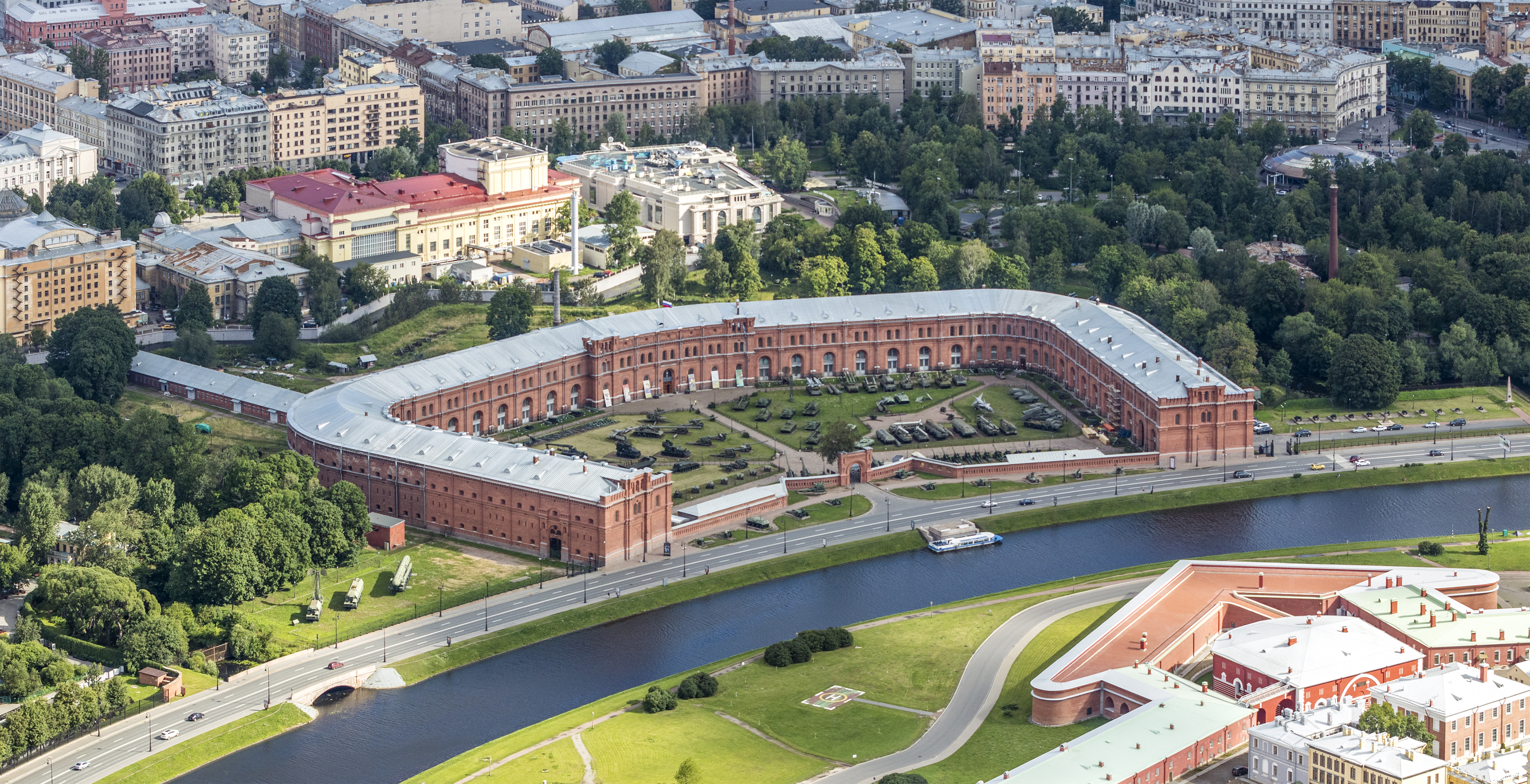
Military Historical Museum of Artillery, Engineers and Signal Corps

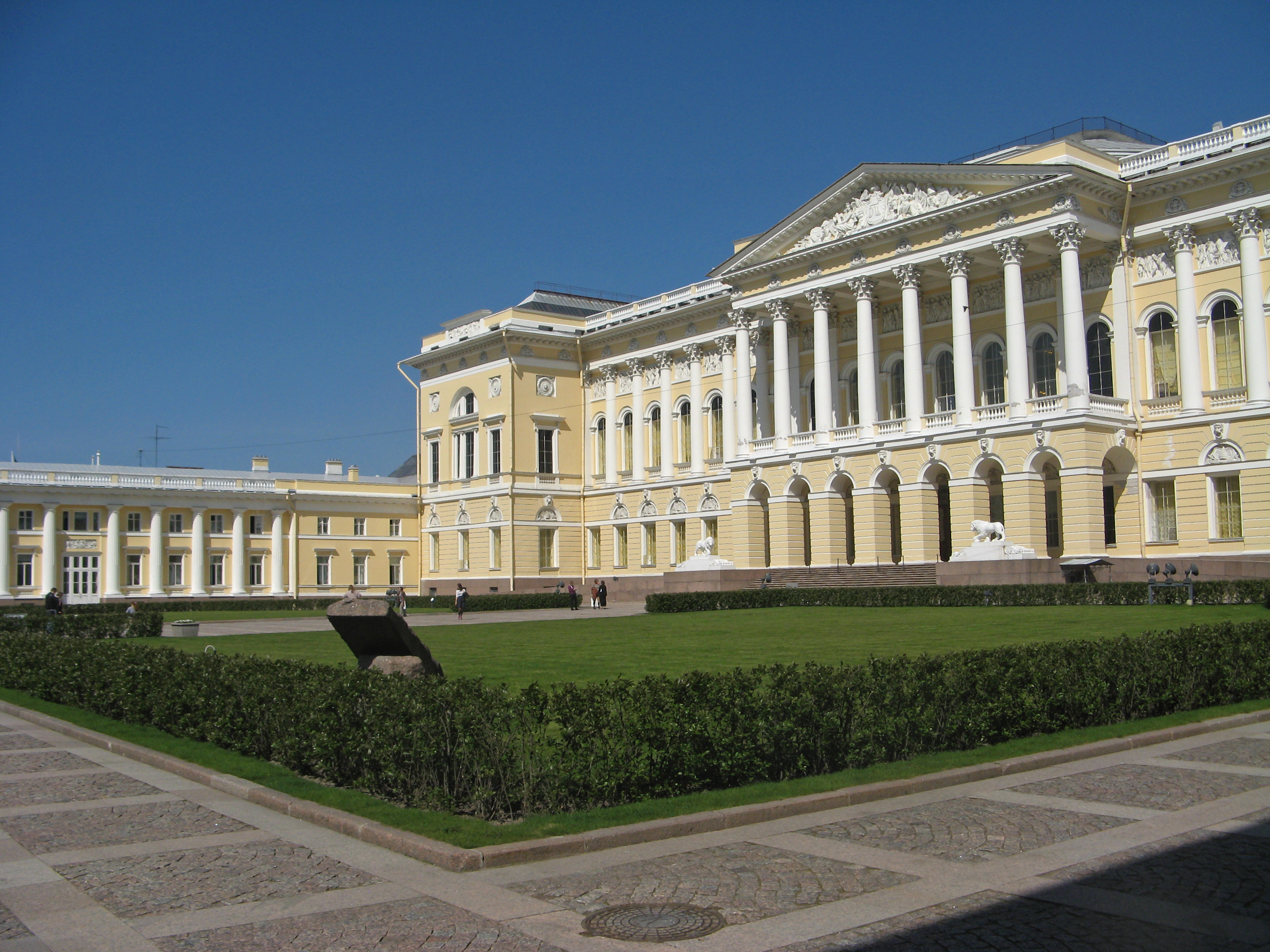
The Russian Museum

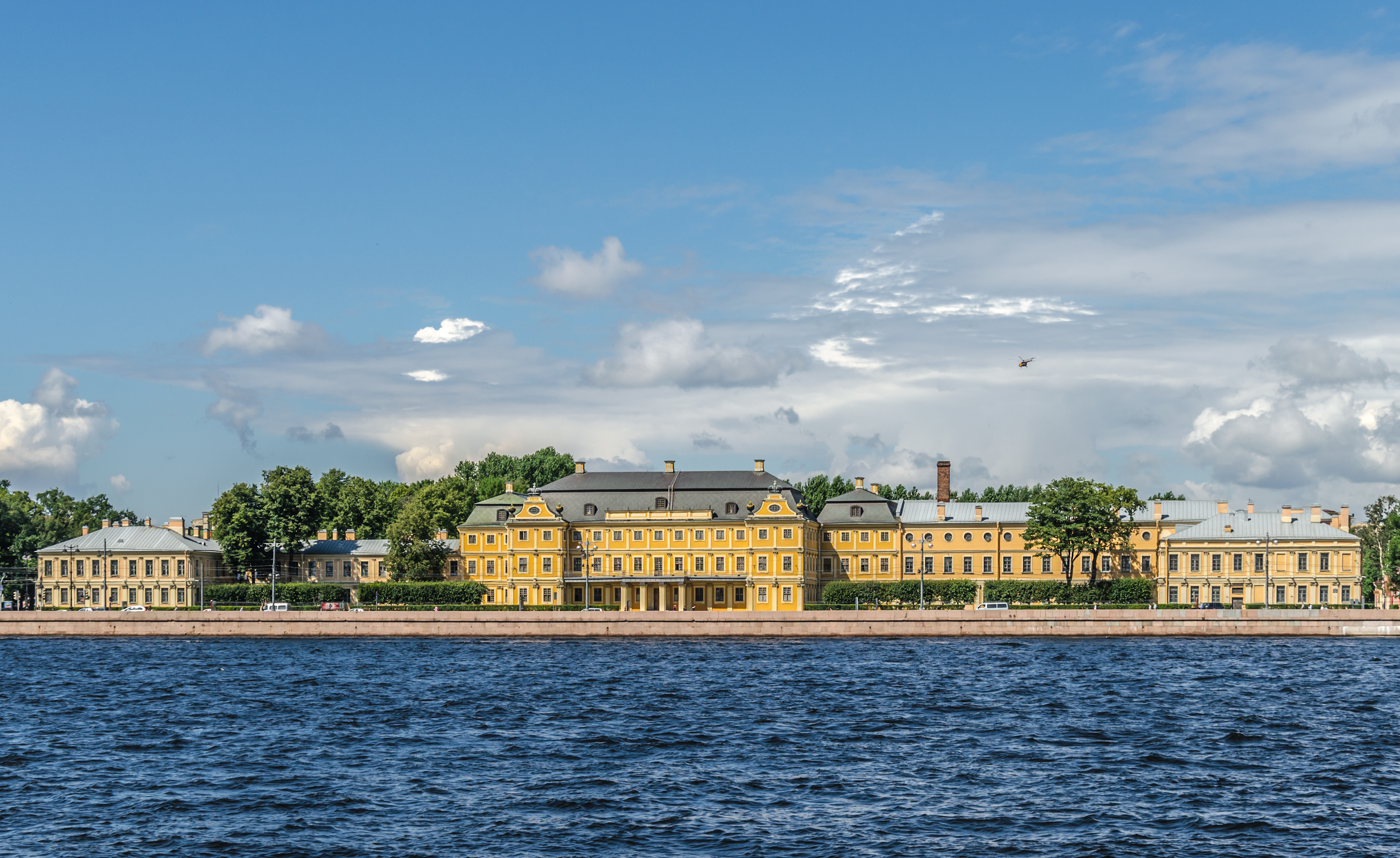
The Menshikov Palace, a branch of the Hermitage Museum

Museums in Saint Petersburg

- Arctic and Antarctic Museum
- ARKA Gallery
- Central Naval Museum
- Dmitry Mendeleev's Memorial Museum Apartment
- Dostoyevsky Museum
- Erarta
  - Erarta Galleries
- Fabergé Museum in Saint Petersburg
- Grand Maket Rossiya
- Hermitage Museum
  - Hermitage cats
- Kunstkamera
- Military Historical Museum of Artillery, Engineers and Signal Corps
- Museum of Electrical Transport
- Museum of Political History of Russia
- Museum of Russian Submarine Forces
- National Pushkin Museum
- Rimsky-Korsakov Apartment and Museum
- Russian cruiser Aurora
- Russian Museum
  - Cabin of Peter the Great
  - Collections of the Russian Museum
  - Russian Museum of Ethnography
- Russian Museum of Military Medicine
- Russian Railway Museum
- Saint Petersburg Toy Museum
- State Museum of the History of St. Petersburg
- Stieglitz Museum of Applied Arts
- Suvorov Museum
- V.V. Dokuchaev Central Museum of Soil
- Zoological Museum of the Zoological Institute of the Russian Academy of Sciences

==== Palaces and villas in Saint Petersburg ====
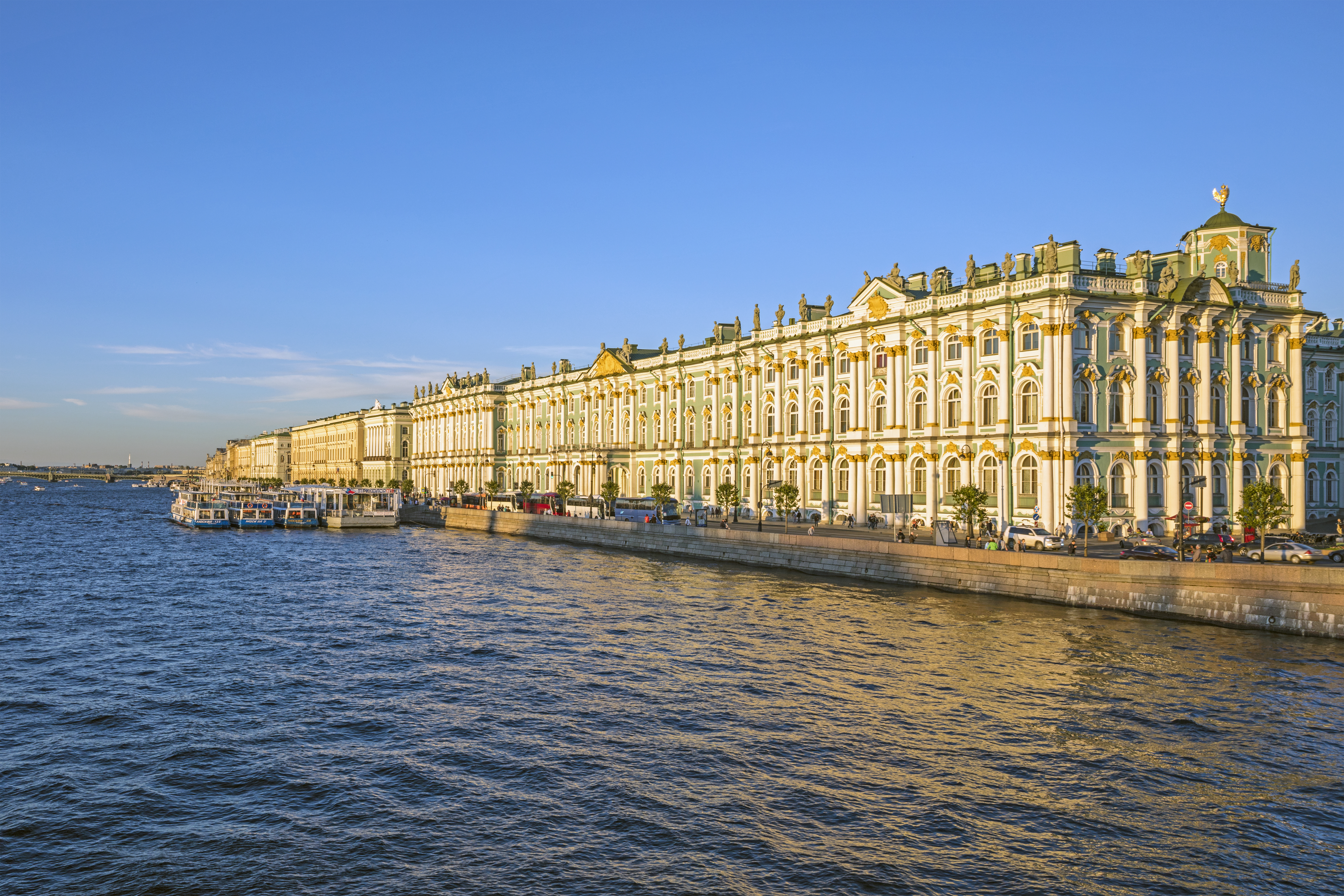
The Winter Palace

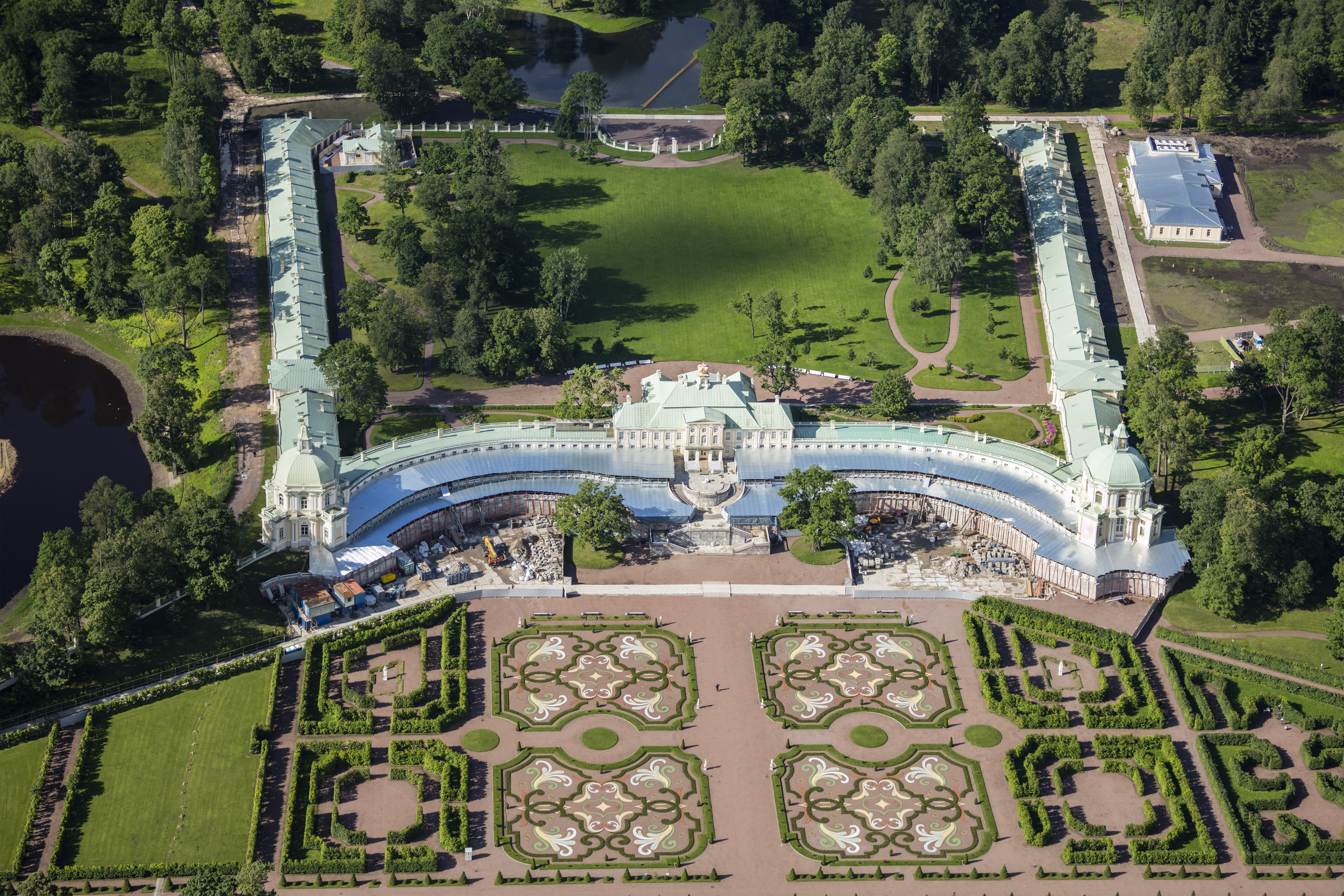
Oranienbaum, the Grand Menshikov Palace

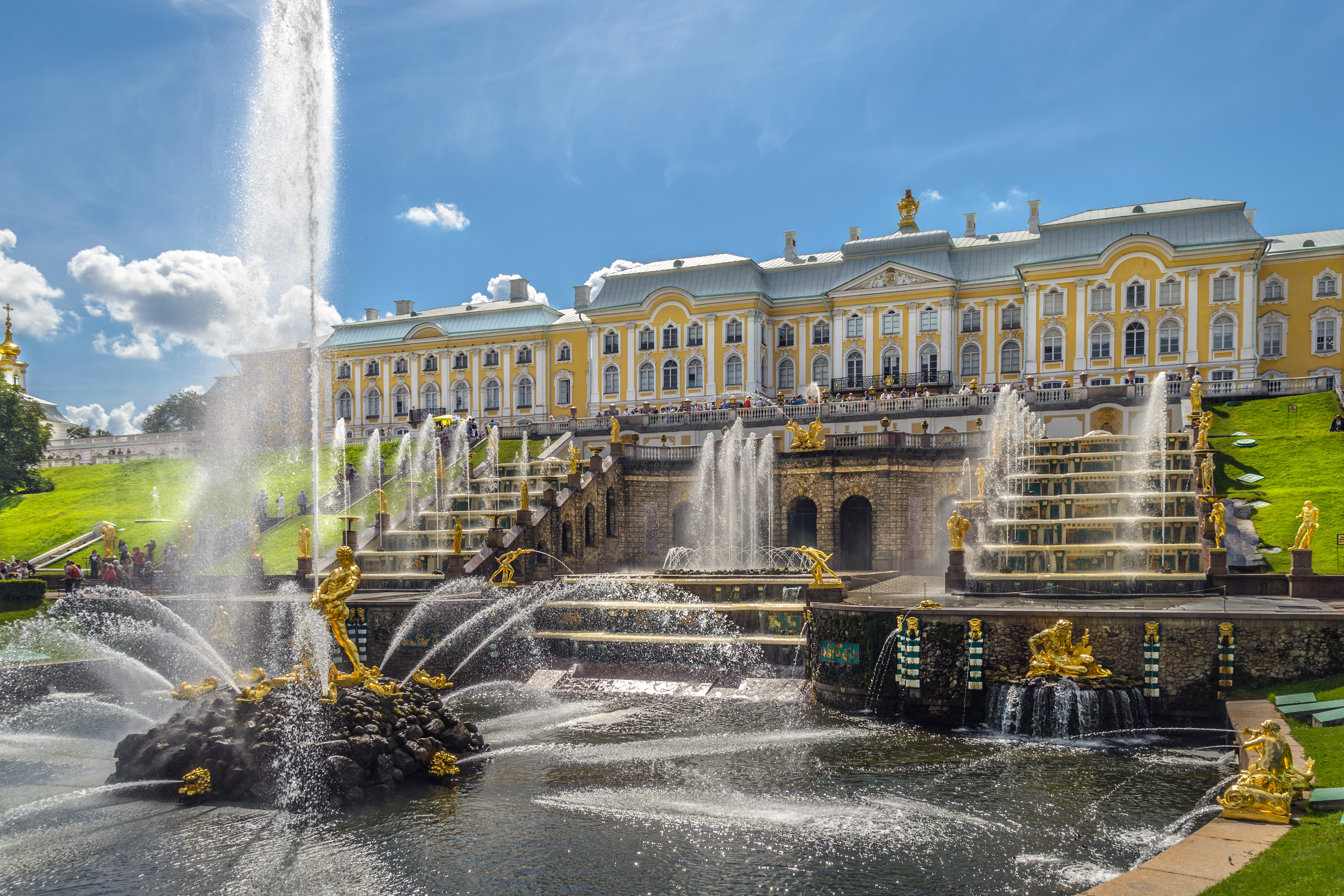
Peterhof Palace

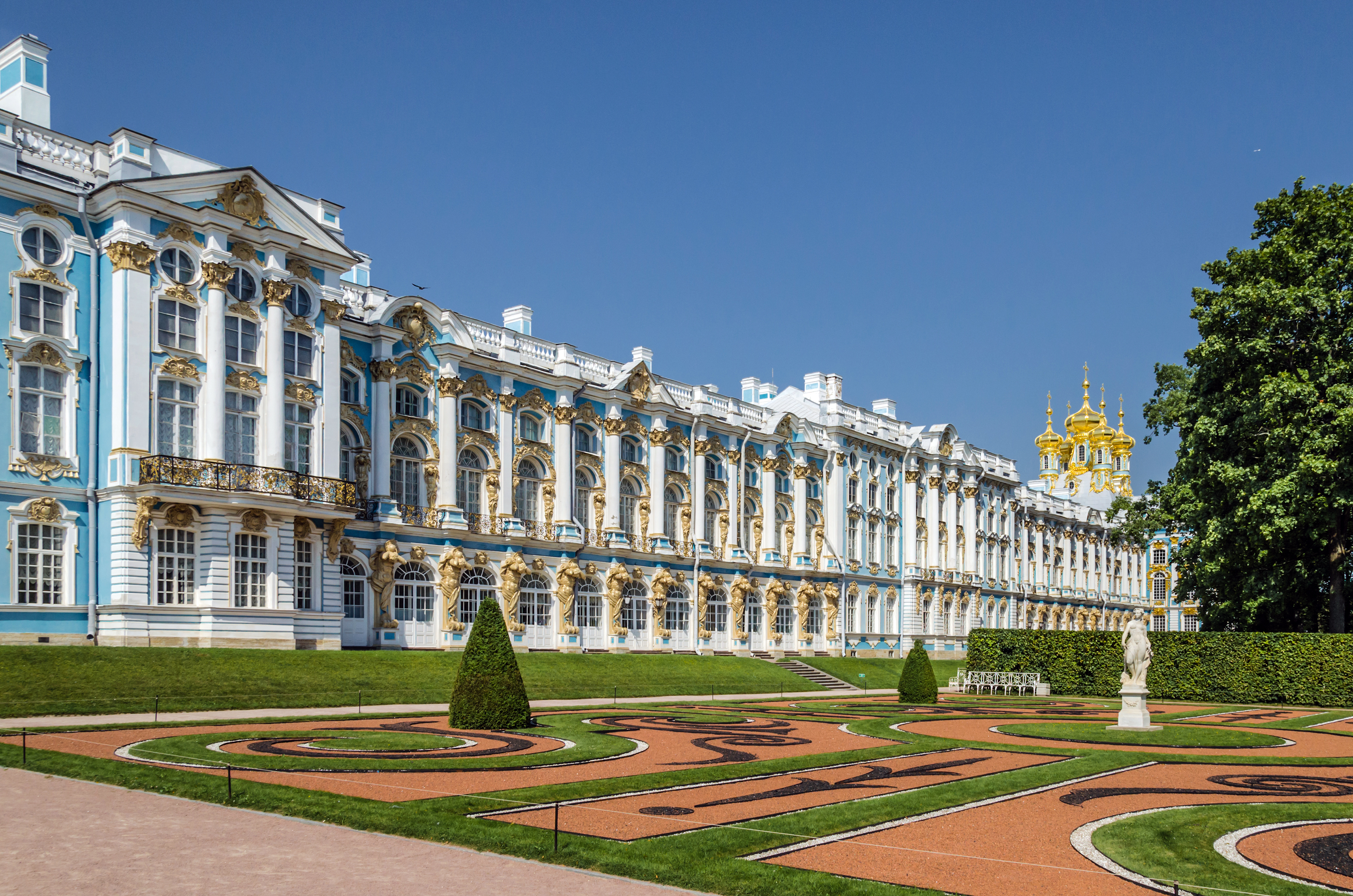
Catherine Palace in Tsarskoye Selo

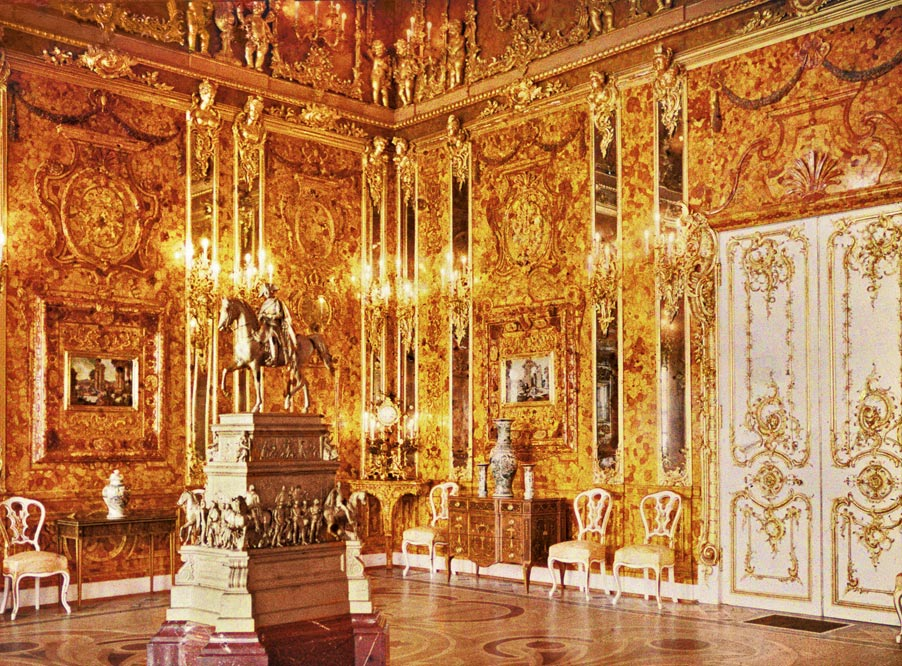
The Amber Room in 1917

- Alexis Palace
- Anichkov Palace
- Beloselsky-Belozersky Palace
- Gatchina Palace
- Kamenny Island Palace
- Kikin Hall
- Lobanov-Rostovsky Palace
- Marble Palace
- Mariinsky Palace
- Menshikov Palace
- Moika Palace
- Naryshkin-Shuvalov Palace
- Nevsky Prospect 86
- New Michael Palace
- Nicholas Palace
- Oranienbaum
- Pavlovsk Palace
- Peterhof Palace
  - Monplaisir Palace
  - Peterhof Grand Palace
- Saint Michael's Castle
- Saltykov Mansion
- Shuvalov Palace
- Stroganov Palace
- Summer Palace
- Summer Palace of Peter the Great
- Tauride Palace
- Tsarskoye Selo
  - Alexander Palace
  - Catherine Palace
    - Amber Room
    - Kagul Obelisk
  - Sophia Cathedral
  - Tsarskoye Selo Lyceum
- Vladimir Palace
- Vorontsov Palace
- Winter Palace
  - Military Gallery of the Winter Palace
  - Neva Enfilade of the Winter Palace
  - Private Apartments of the Winter Palace
- Yelagin Palace

==== Parks and gardens in Saint Petersburg ====
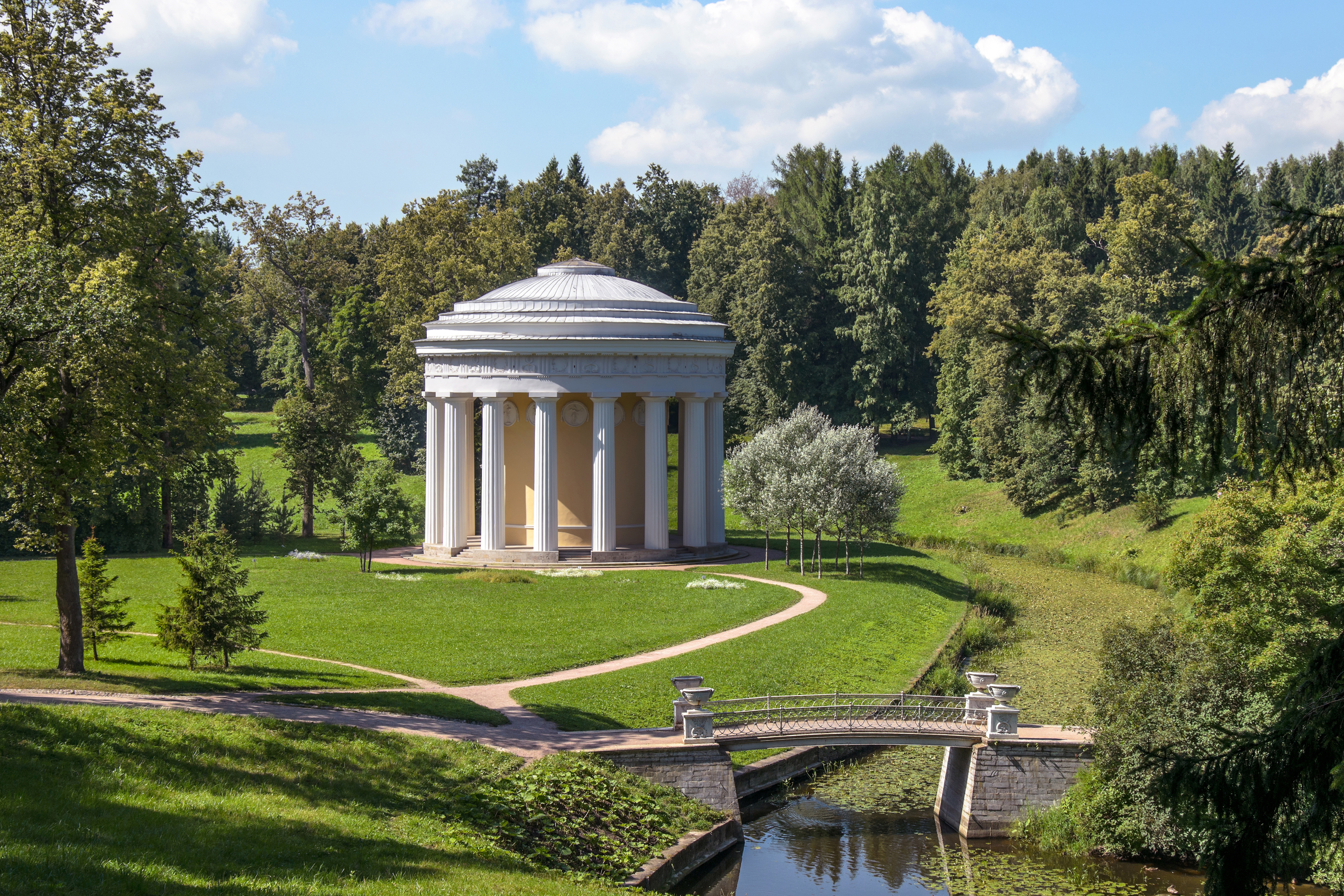
The "Temple of Friendship" in Pavlovsk Park

- Alexander Garden
- Alexander Park
- Catherine Park
- Field of Mars
- Maritime Victory Park
- Mikhailovsky Garden
  - Rossi Pavilion
- Monplaisir Garden
- Moskovsky Victory Park
- Pavlovsk Park
- Saint Petersburg Botanical Garden
- Summer Garden

==== Public squares in Saint Petersburg ====
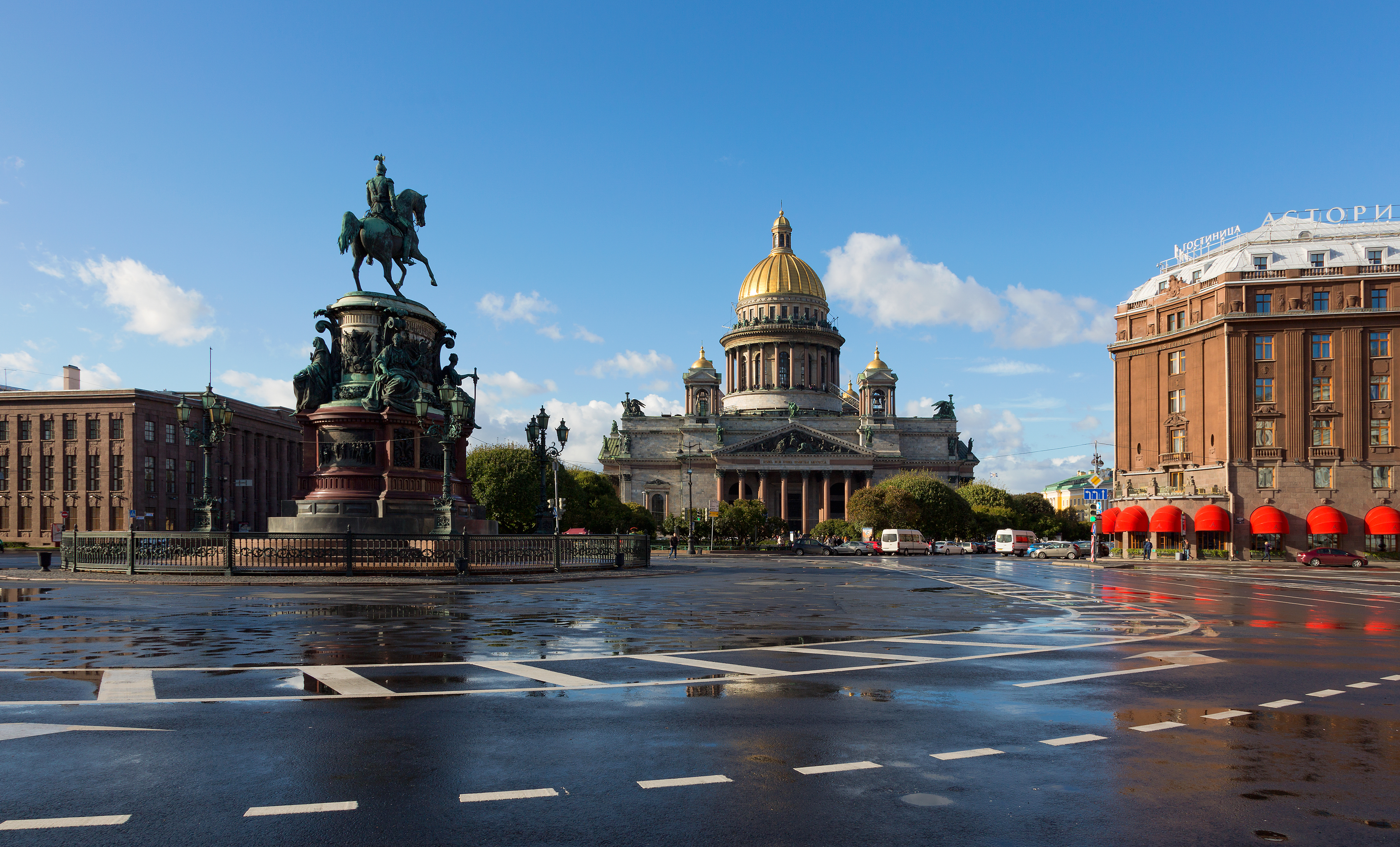
Saint Isaac's Square

Public squares in Saint Petersburg

- Manezhnaya Square
- Muzhestva Square
- Palace Square
- Saint Isaac's Square
- Senate Square
- Sennaya Square
- Victory Square
- Vosstaniya Square

==== Religious buildings in Saint Petersburg ====
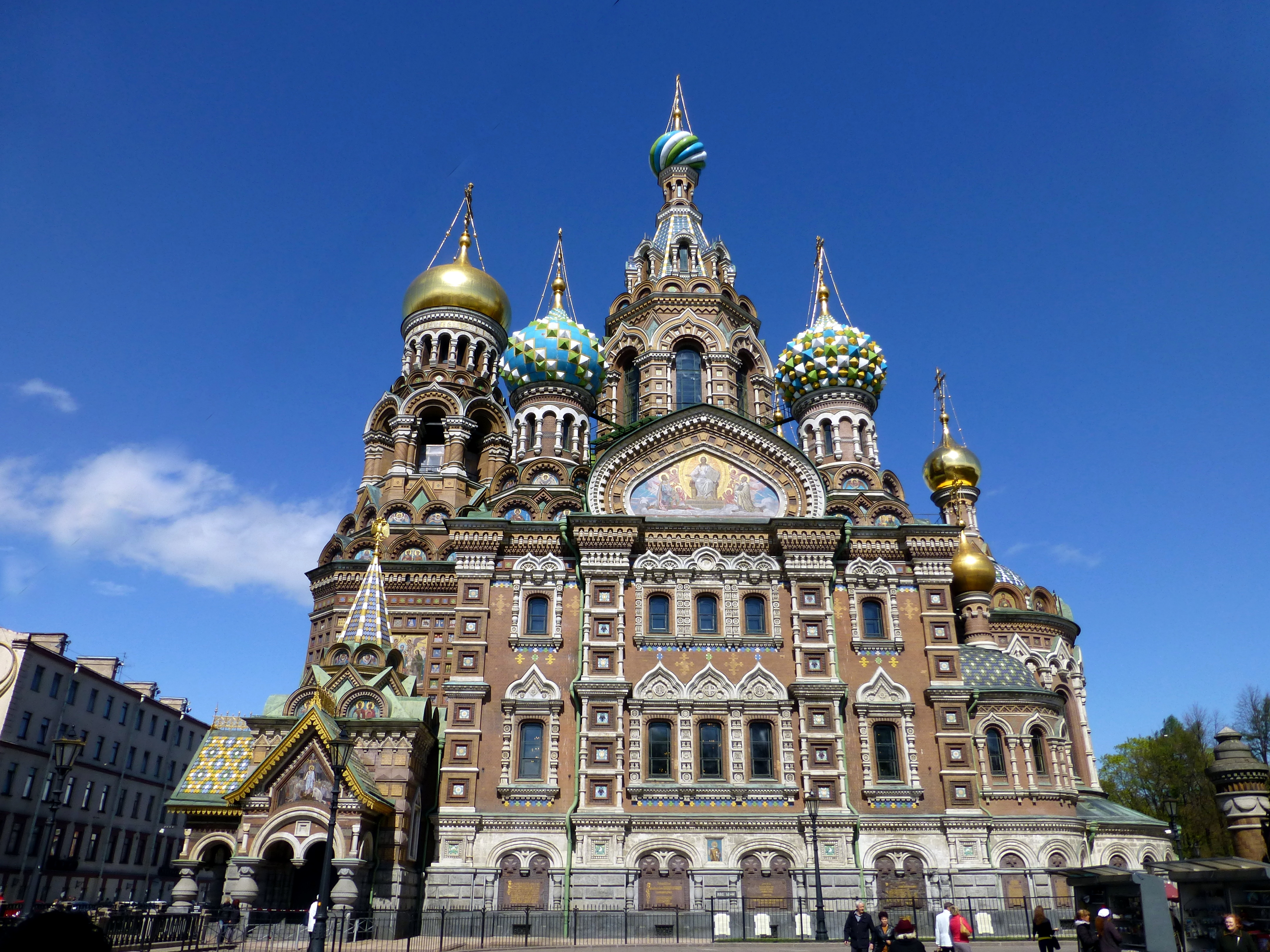
The Church of the Savior on Blood

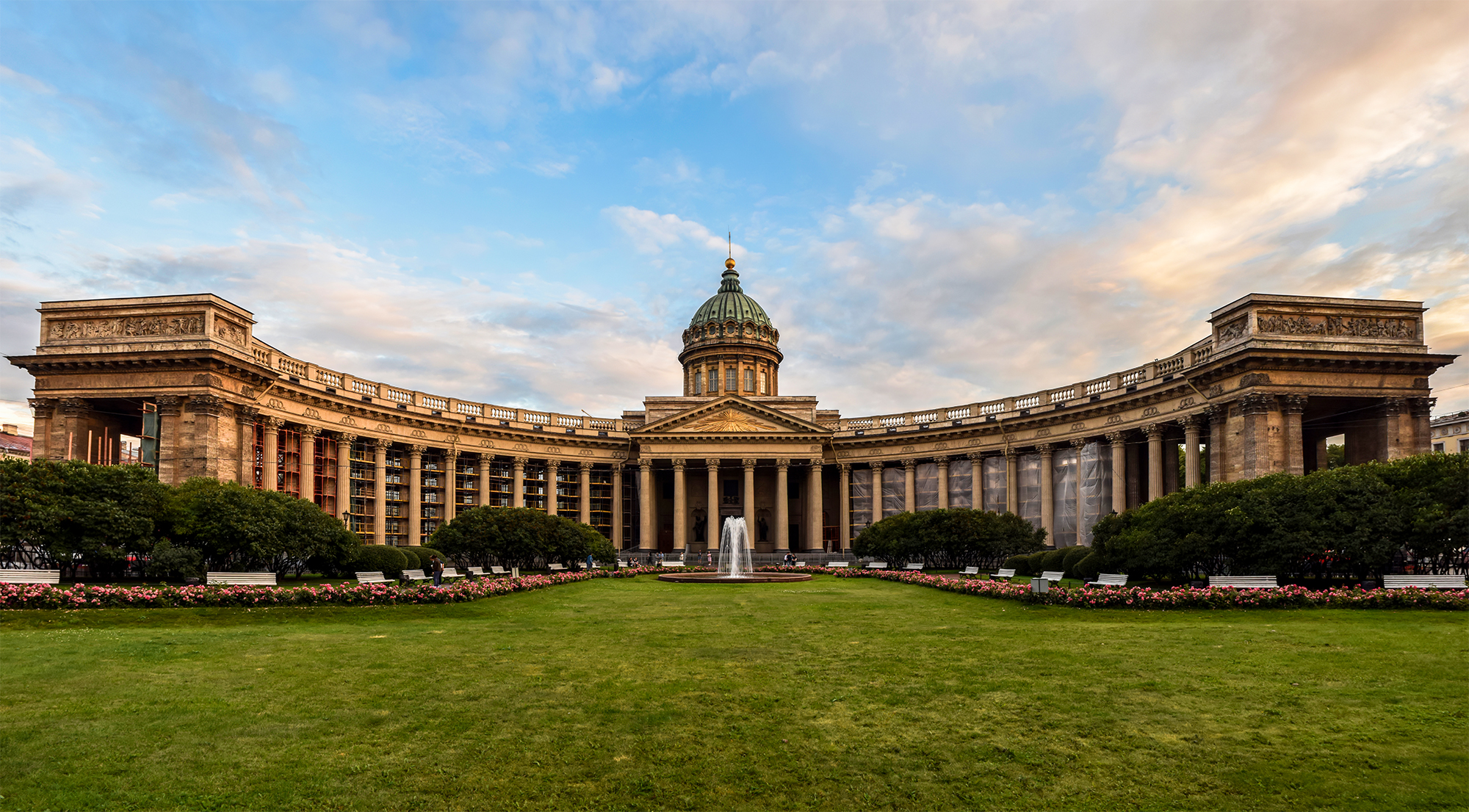
Kazan Cathedral

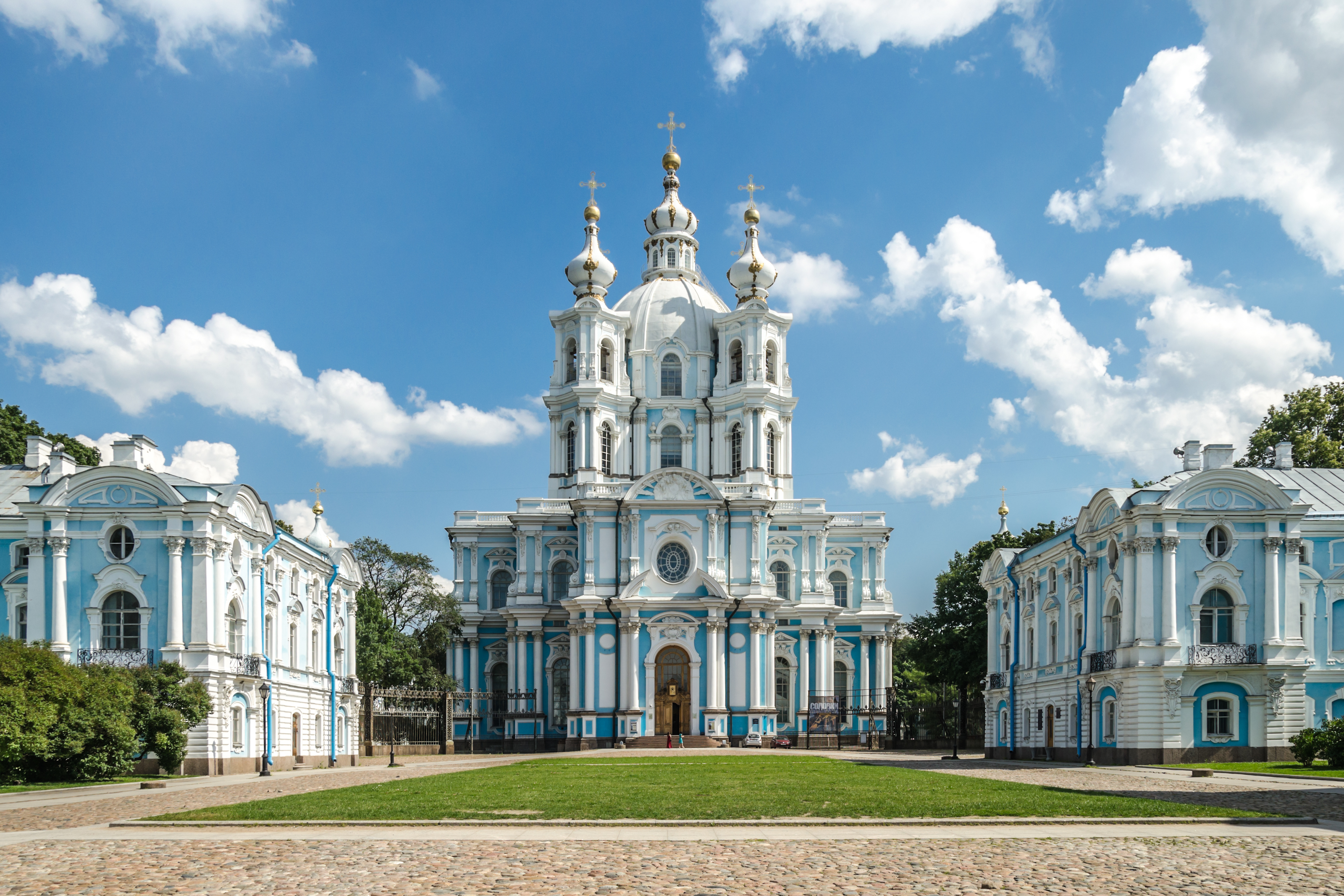
Smolny Convent

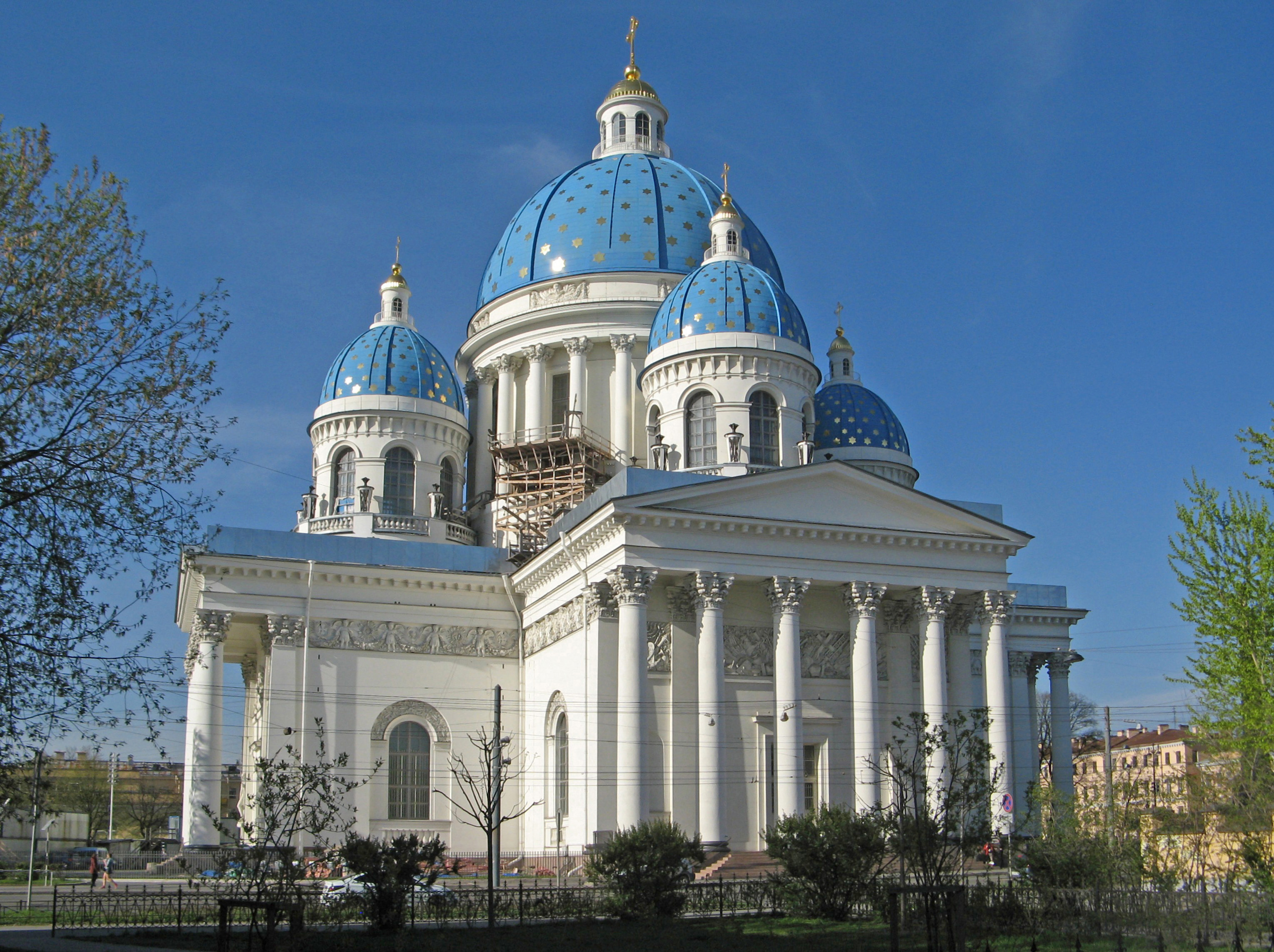
Trinity Cathedral

- Alexander Nevsky Lavra
  - Holy Trinity Cathedral of the Alexander Nevsky Lavra
- Ascension Cathedral
- Cathedral of the Assumption of the Blessed Virgin Mary
- Chesme Church
- Church of St. Catherine
- Church of the Epiphany
- Church of the Savior on Blood
- Coastal Monastery of Saint Sergius
- Evangelical Lutheran Church of Saint Mary
- Gothic Chapel
- Ioannovsky Convent
- Kazan Cathedral
- Kronstadt Naval Cathedral
- Lutheran Church of Saint Peter and Saint Paul
- Old Trinity Cathedral
- Sacred Heart Church
- Saint Andrew's Cathedral
- Saint Catherine's Armenian Church
- Saint Isaac's Cathedral
- Saint Sampson's Cathedral
- Saviour Church on Sennaya Square
- Smolny Convent
- St. John the Baptist Church
- St. John's Church
- St. Julian's Church
- St. Nicholas Naval Cathedral
- St. Stanislaus Church
- St. Vladimir's Cathedral
- Transfiguration Cathedral
- Trinity Cathedral
- Vladimirskaya Church

==== Secular buildings in Saint Petersburg ====
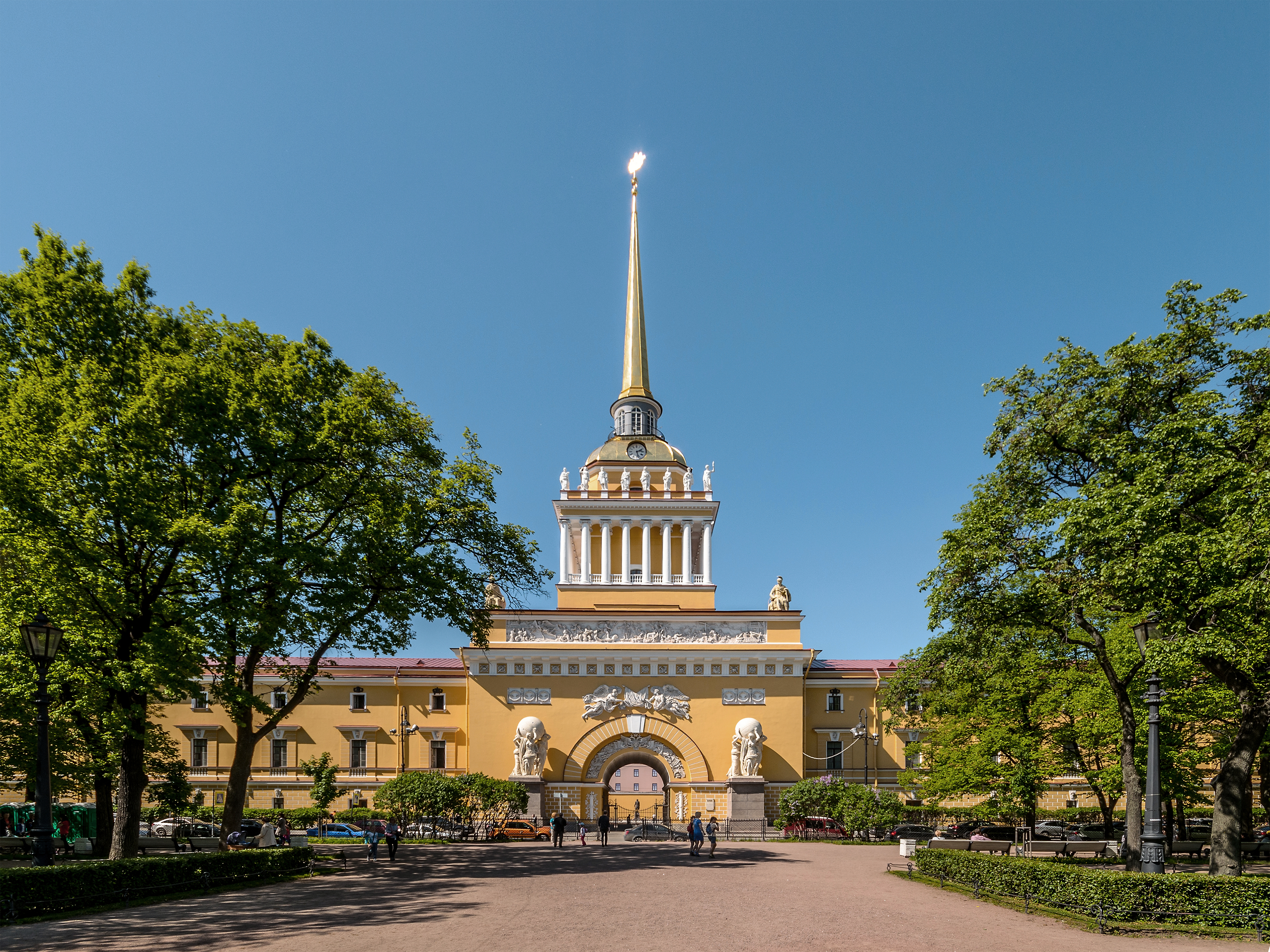
The Admiralty tower

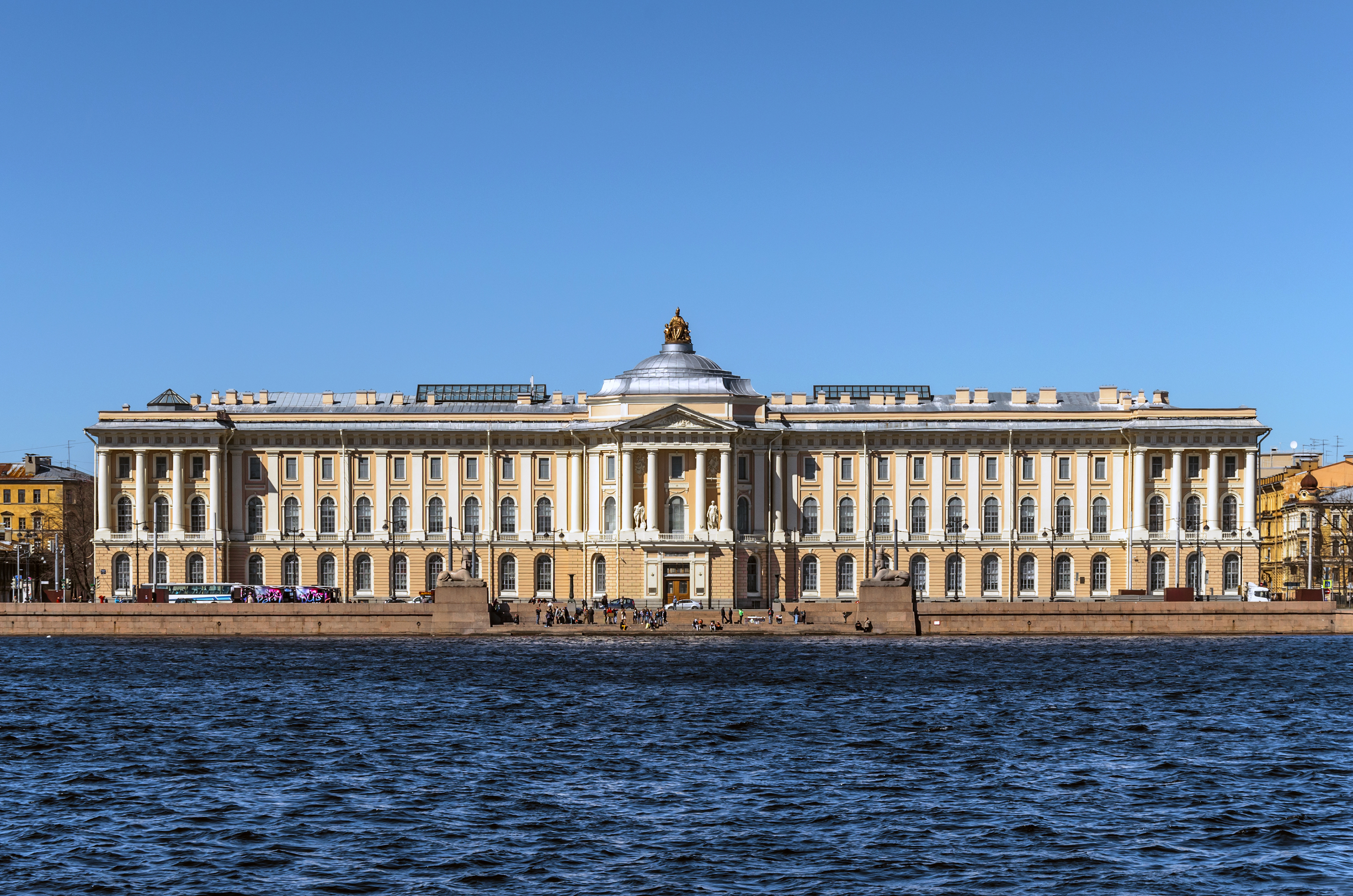
The Imperial Academy of Arts

Buildings and structures in Saint Petersburg

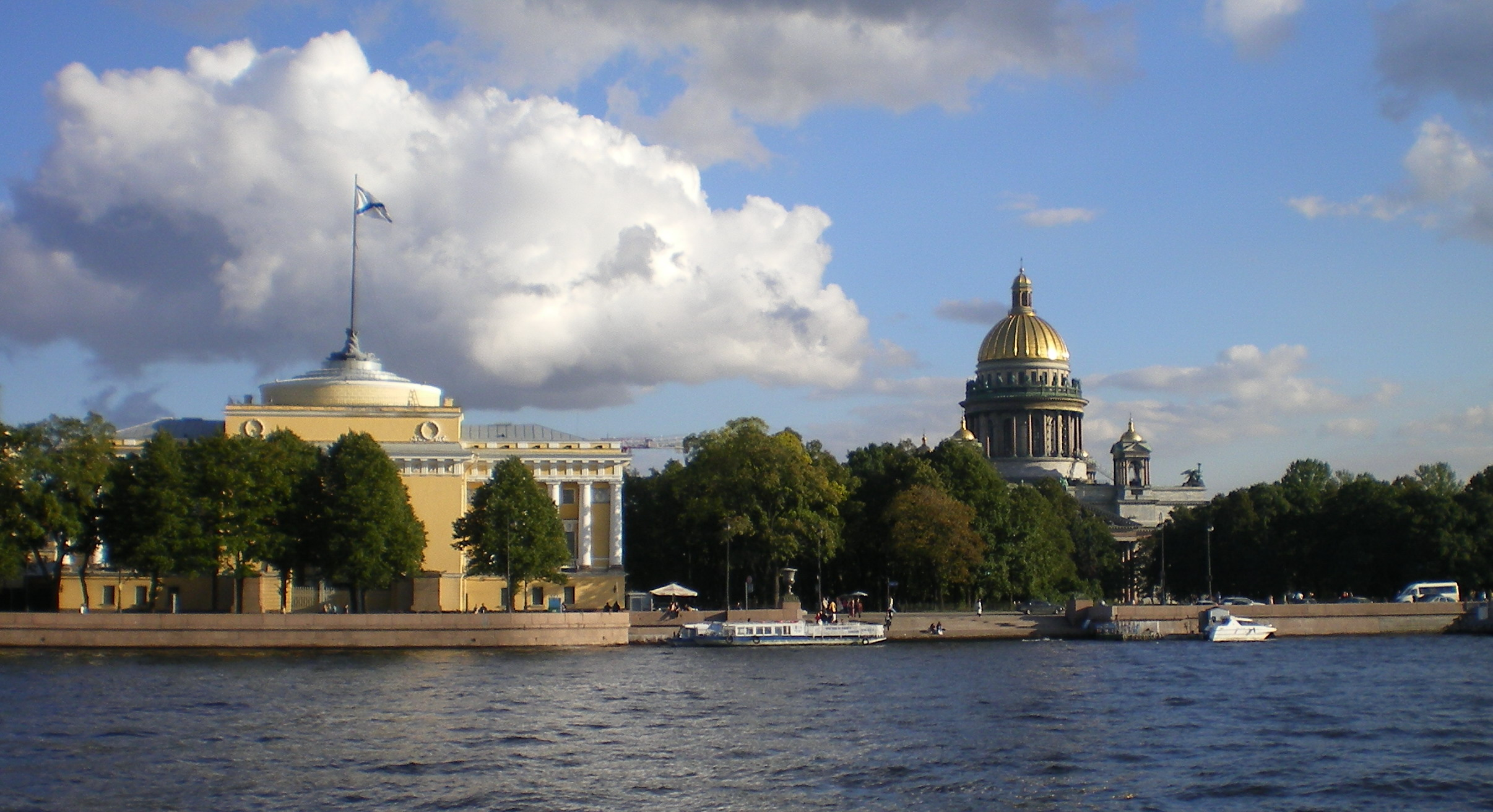
The Admiralty Embankment

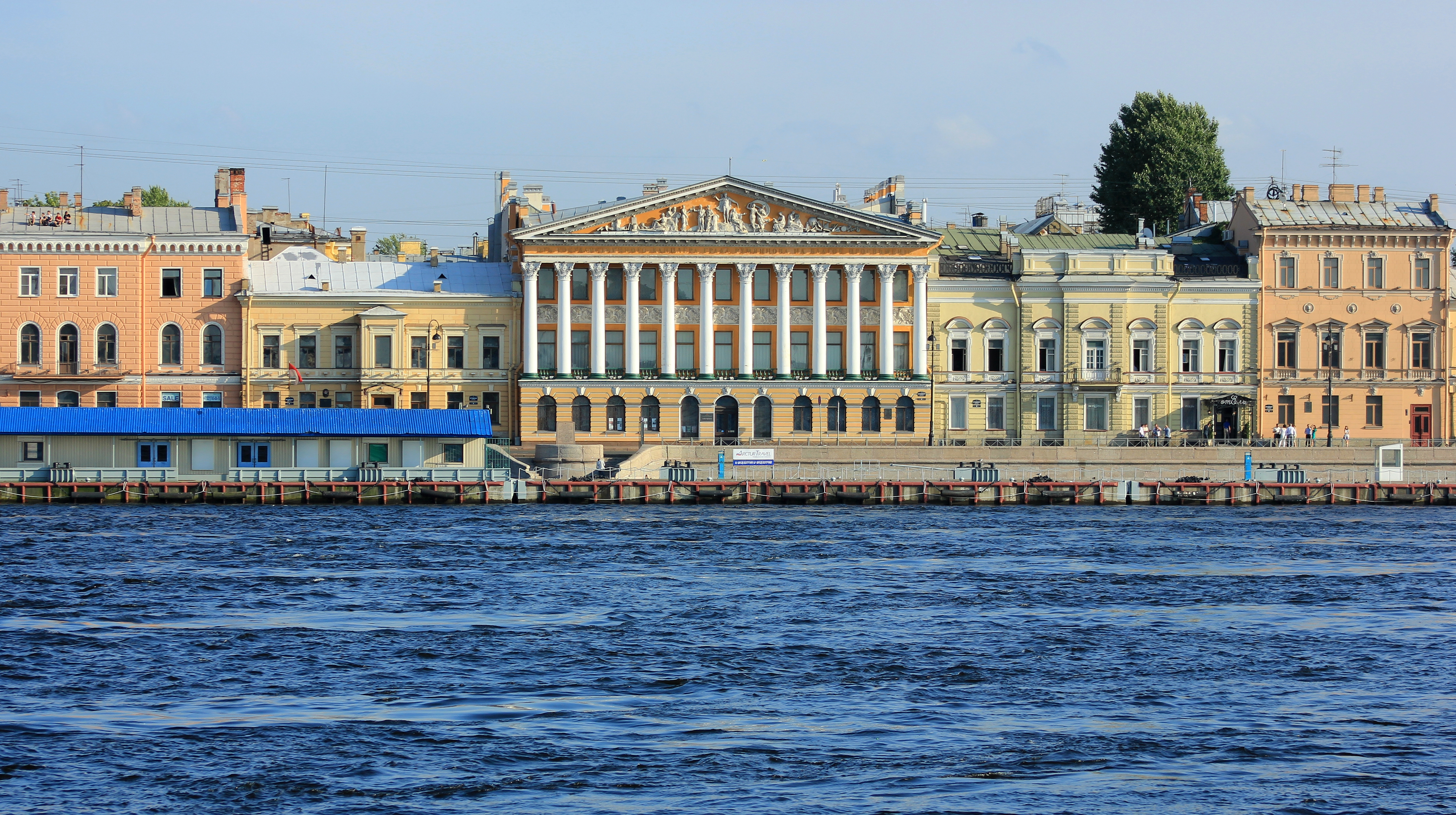
The English Embankment

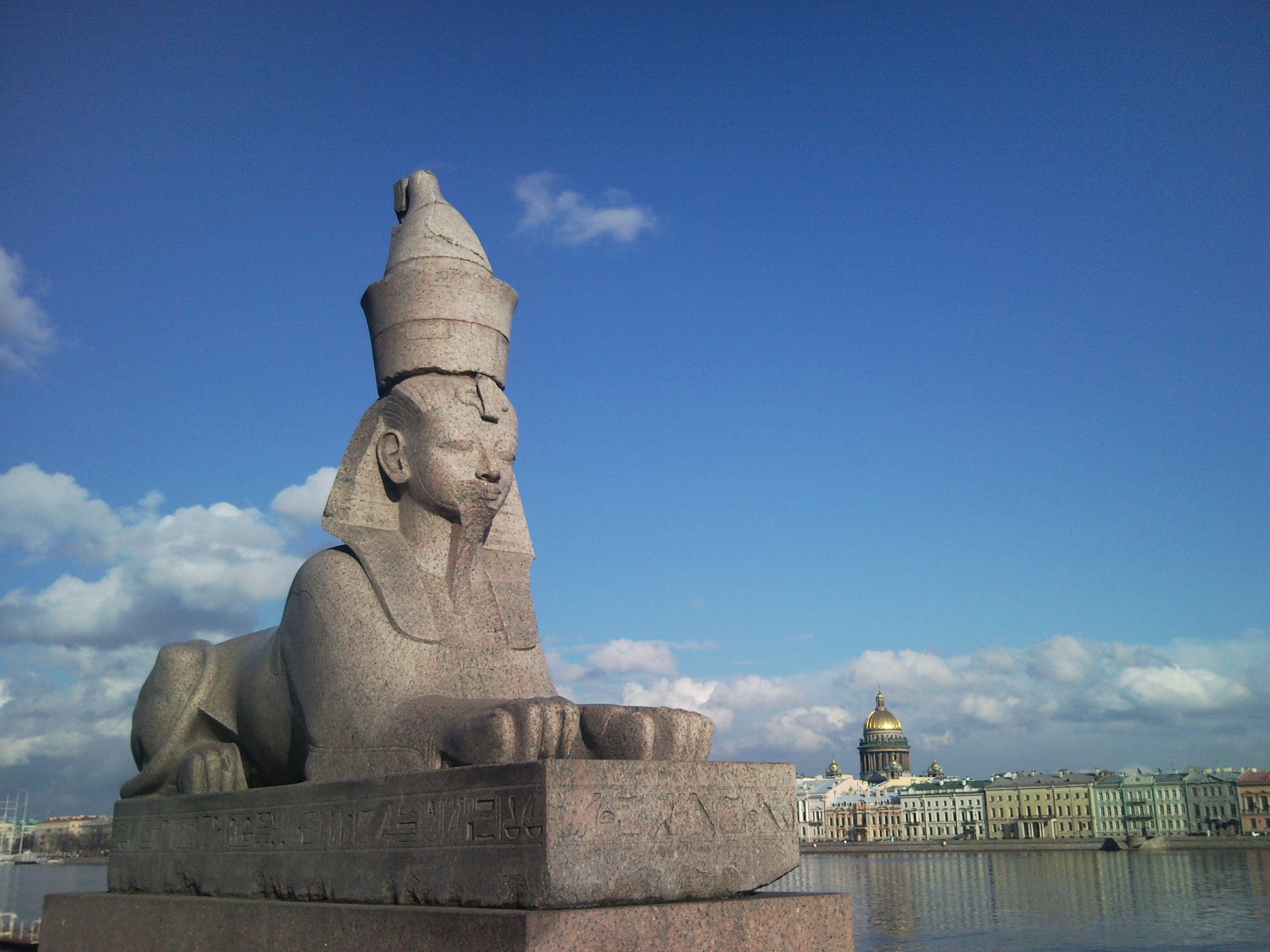
Quay with Sphinxes

- Admiralty building
- Ciniselli Circus
- Eliseyev Emporium
- Esders and Scheefhaals building
- General Staff Building
- House of Soviets
- Imperial Academy of Arts
- Kotomin House
- Lakhta Center
- Library of the Russian Academy of Sciences
- National Library of Russia
- Old Saint Petersburg Stock Exchange and Rostral Columns
- Pulkovo Observatory
- Pushkin House
- Saint Petersburg City Duma
- Saint Petersburg Commodity and Stock Exchange
- Saint Petersburg Mint
- Singer House
- Smolny Institute
- Tolstoy House
- Twelve Collegia
- Utkina Dacha
- Wawelberg Bank building

==== Streets in Saint Petersburg ====
- Bolshoy Prospekt
- Gorokhovaya Street
- Kamennoostrovsky Prospekt
- Ligovsky Avenue
- Lines of Vasilyevsky Island
- Liteyny Avenue
- Malaya Sadovaya Street
- Millionnaya Street
- Moskovsky Avenue
- Neva embankments
  - Admiralty Embankment
    - Lions at the Dvortsovaya pier
  - English Embankment
  - Kutuzov Embankment
  - Palace Embankment
  - Universitetskaya Embankment
    - Quay with Sphinxes
- Nevsky Prospect
- Sadovaya Street

==== Theatres in Saint Petersburg ====
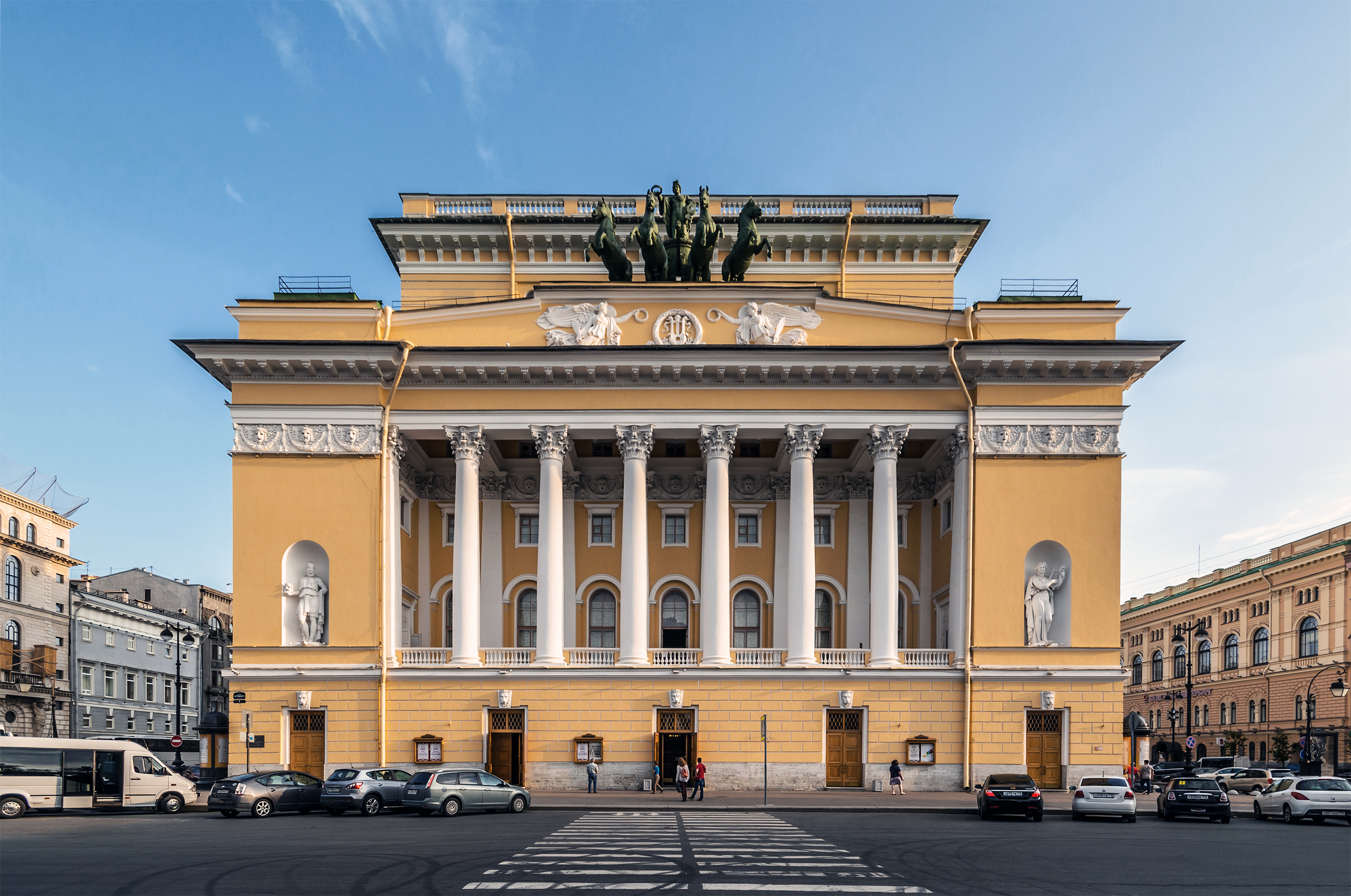
The Alexandrinsky Theatre

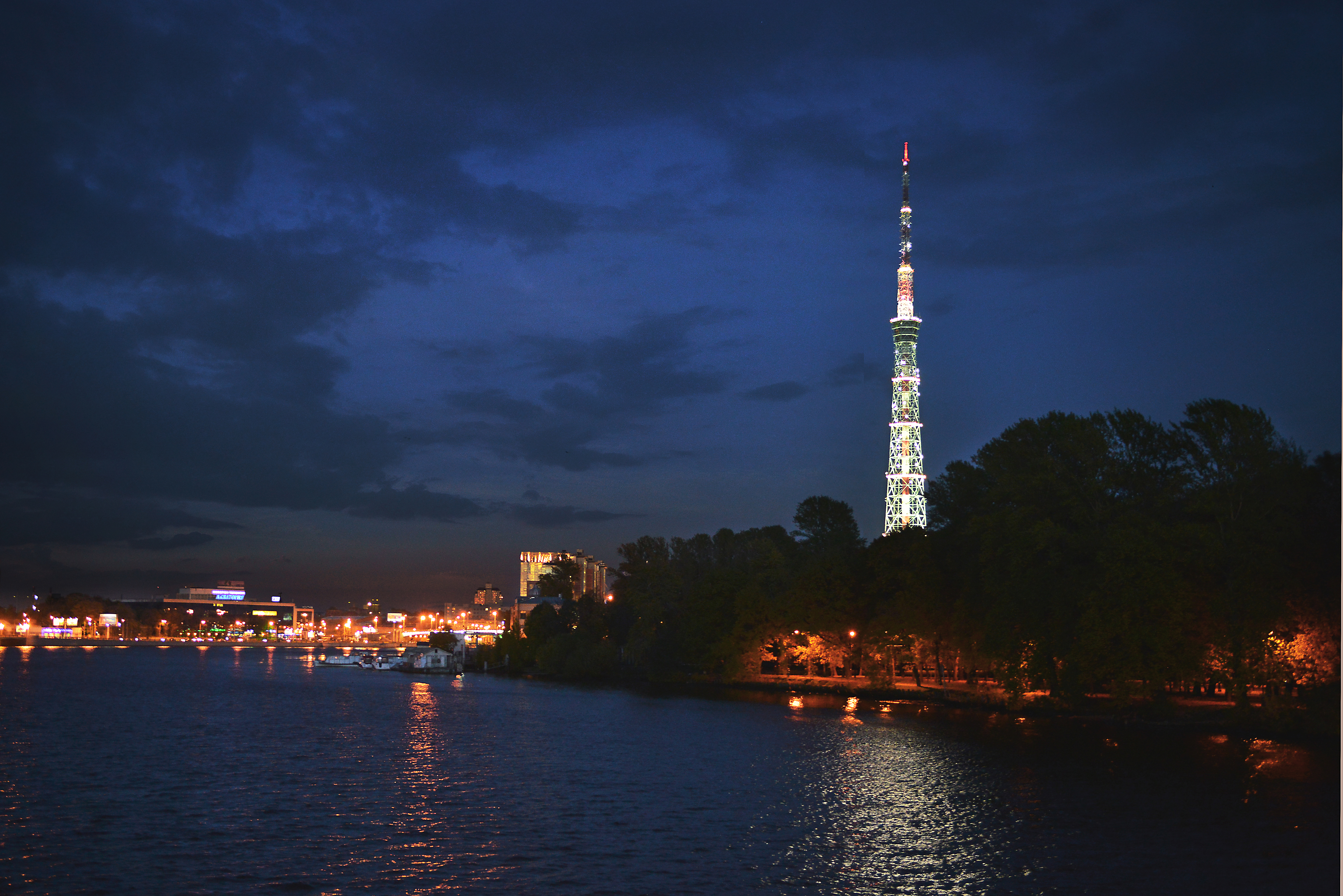
Saint Petersburg TV Tower

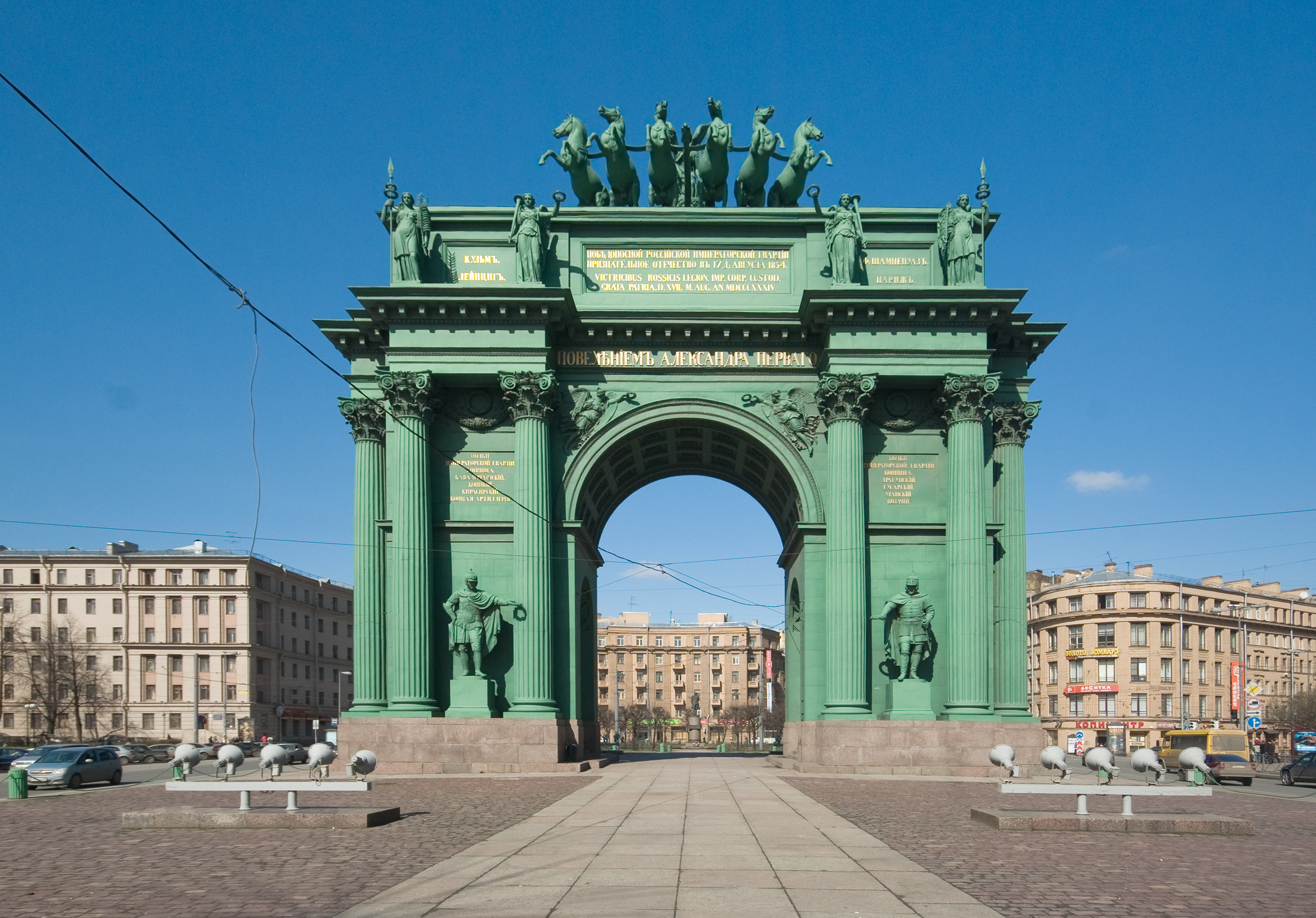
Narva Triumphal Arch

Theatres in Saint Petersburg

- Alexandrinsky Theatre
- Baltic House Festival Theatre
- Bolshoi Theatre
- Hermitage Theatre
- Kamenny Island Theatre
- Komedianty Theatre
- Lensovet Theatre
- Liteiny Theatre
- Mariinsky Theatre
- Mikhailovsky Theatre
- Ostrov Theatre
- Saint Petersburg Comedy Theatre
- Tovstonogov Bolshoi Drama Theater
- Youth Theatre on the Fontanka
- Zazerkalie

==== Towers in Saint Petersburg ====
- Griffins' tower
- Lesnoy Mole Rear Range Light
- Saint Petersburg TV Tower

==== Triumphal arches in Saint Petersburg ====
- Moscow Triumphal Gate
- Narva Triumphal Arch

=== Demographics of Saint Petersburg ===
Demographics of Saint Petersburg

== Government and politics of Saint Petersburg ==
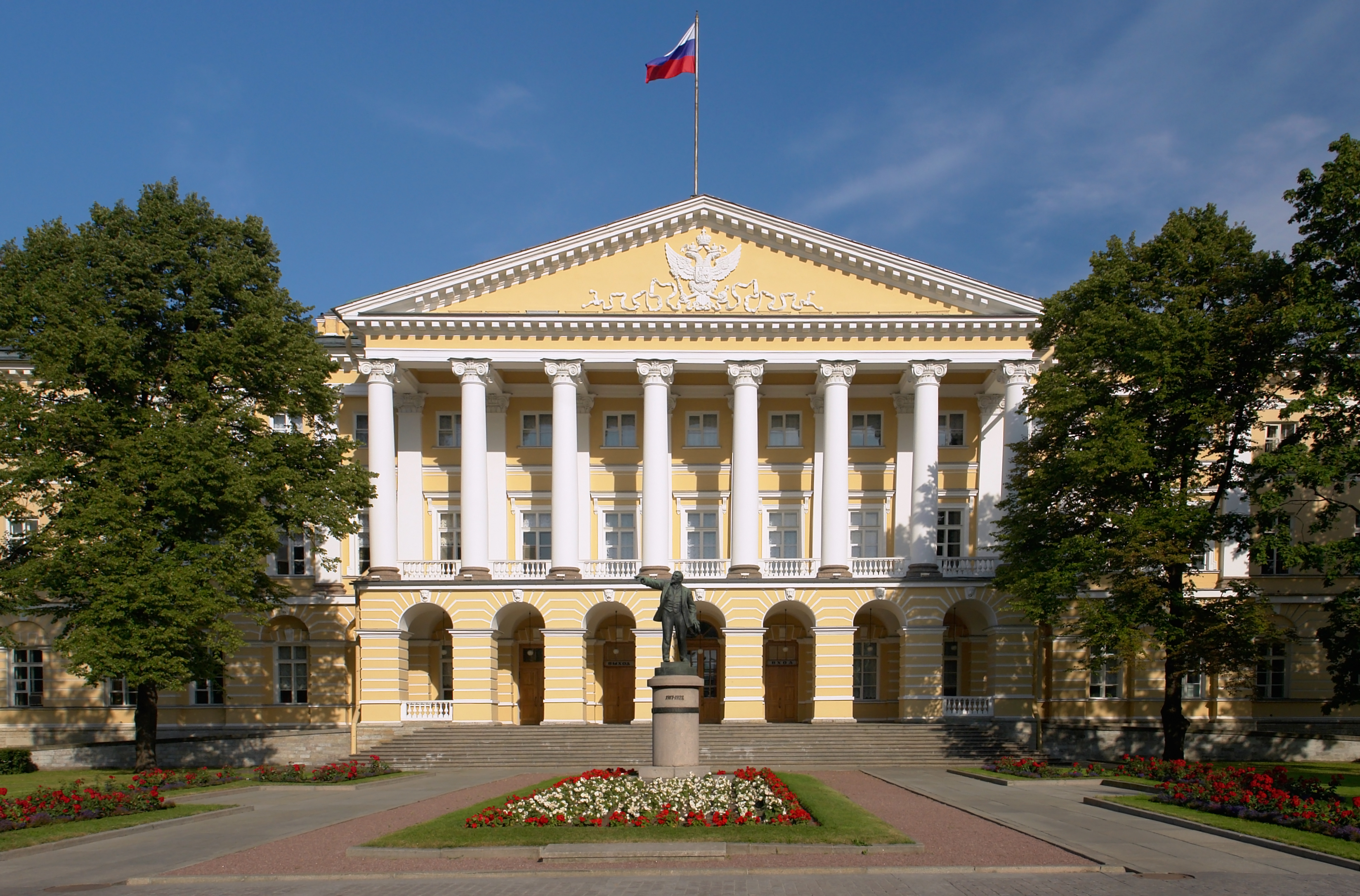
Smolny Institute, the seat of the governor's office and city administration

Politics of Saint Petersburg

- Legislative Assembly of Saint Petersburg
- Saint Petersburg City Administration
  - Governor of Saint Petersburg

=== Law and order in Saint Petersburg ===
- Charter of Saint Petersburg
- Saint Petersburg Police

=== Military in Saint Petersburg ===
- Western Military District

== History of Saint Petersburg ==
History of Saint Petersburg

=== History of Saint Petersburg, by period or event ===
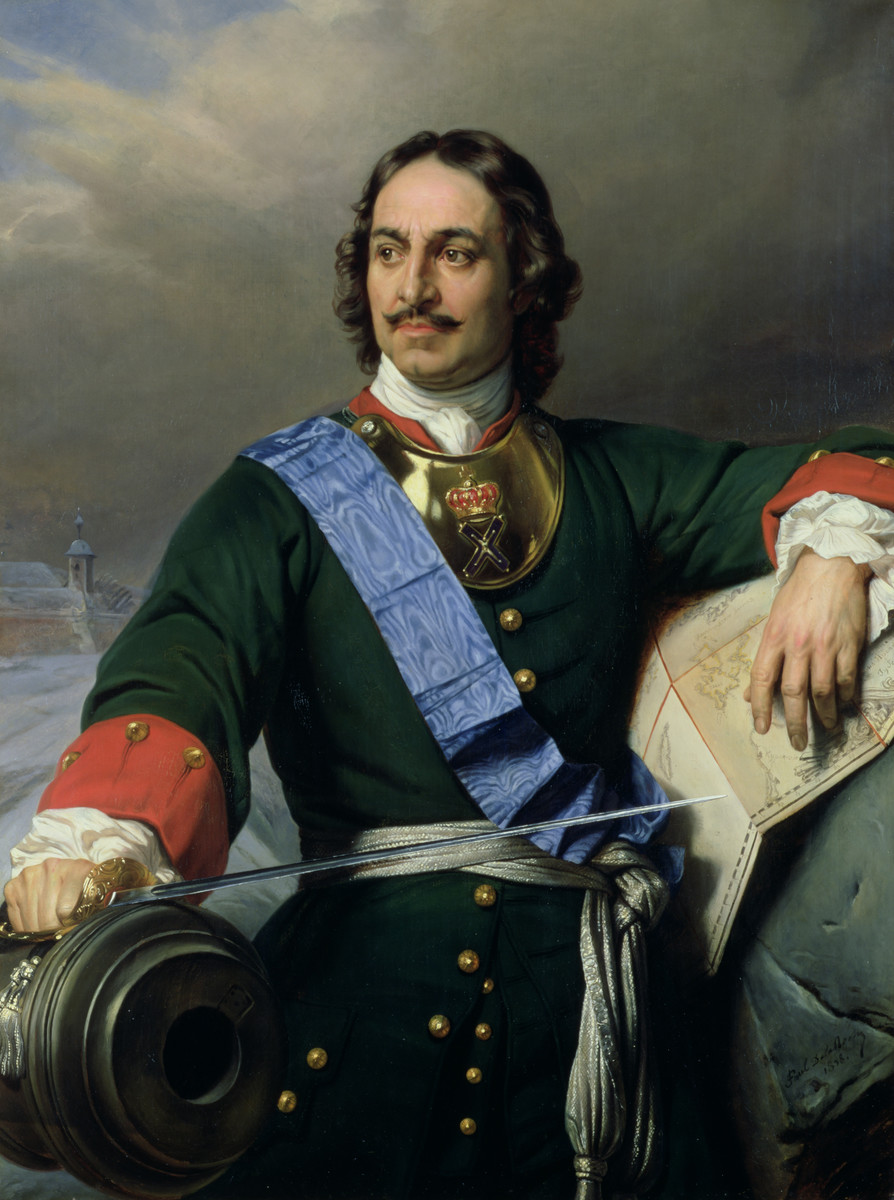
Tsar Peter the Great, who founded Saint Petersburg in 1703

Timeline of Saint Petersburg

- Saint Petersburg during the Imperial Era (1703–1917)
  - Founding of Saint Petersburg (1703) – Tsar Peter the Great founded the city on 27 May 1703 after he reconquered the Ingrian land from Sweden, in the Great Northern War. Upon the city's founding, he named the city after his patron saint, the apostle Saint Peter.
  - Peter moved the capital from Moscow to Saint Petersburg in 1712.
  - After the death of Peter the Great in 1725, Peter II of Russia moved his seat back to Moscow, but in 1732 Saint Petersburg became capital of the Russian Empire for more than two hundred years.
  - The Revolution of 1905 began in Saint Petersburg and spread rapidly into the provinces.
  - On 1 September 1914, after the outbreak of World War I, the Imperial government renamed the city Petrograd.
- Saint Petersburg during the Revolution and Soviet Era (1917–1941)
  - In March 1917, during the February Revolution, Nicholas II abdicated.
  - On 7 November 1917, the Bolsheviks led by Vladimir Lenin stormed the Winter Palace in an event known thereafter as the October Revolution. Lenin moved his government to Moscow on 5 March 1918.
  - On 26 January 1924, five days after Lenin's death, Petrograd was renamed Leningrad.
- Saint Petersburg during World War II (1941–1945)
  - Siege of Leningrad (1941–1944)
- Saint Petersburg during the Soviet Era (1945–1991)
  - Leningrad affair (1949–1952) – Stalin had leaders and heroes of the city framed and executed, imprisoned, or exiled to Siberia, due to their popularity, including the mayor.
- Contemporary Era (1991–present)
  - On 12 June 1991, after the collapse of the Soviet Union, in a referendum 54% of voters chose to restore "the original name, Saint Petersburg". Original names returned to many streets, bridges, Metro stations and parks.

=== History of Saint Petersburg, by subject ===
- Treaty of Saint Petersburg (1723)
- Treaty of Saint Petersburg (1762)
- Treaty of Saint Petersburg (1805)
- Treaty of Saint Petersburg (1812)
- Treaty of Saint Petersburg (1825)
- Treaty of Saint Petersburg (1834)
- Treaty of Saint Petersburg (1875)
- Treaty of Saint Petersburg (1881)

== Culture of Saint Petersburg ==
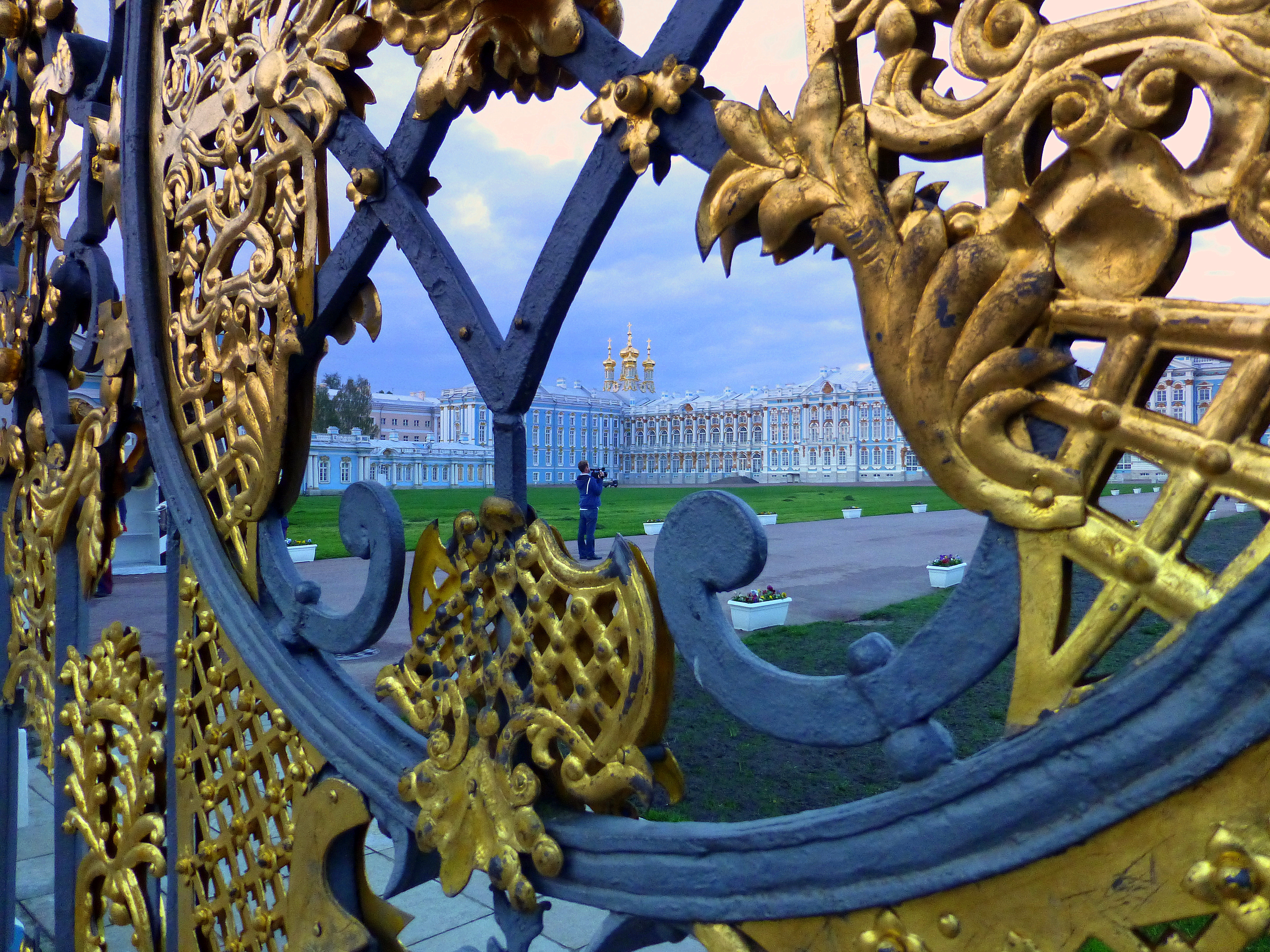
Fence of the Catherine Palace

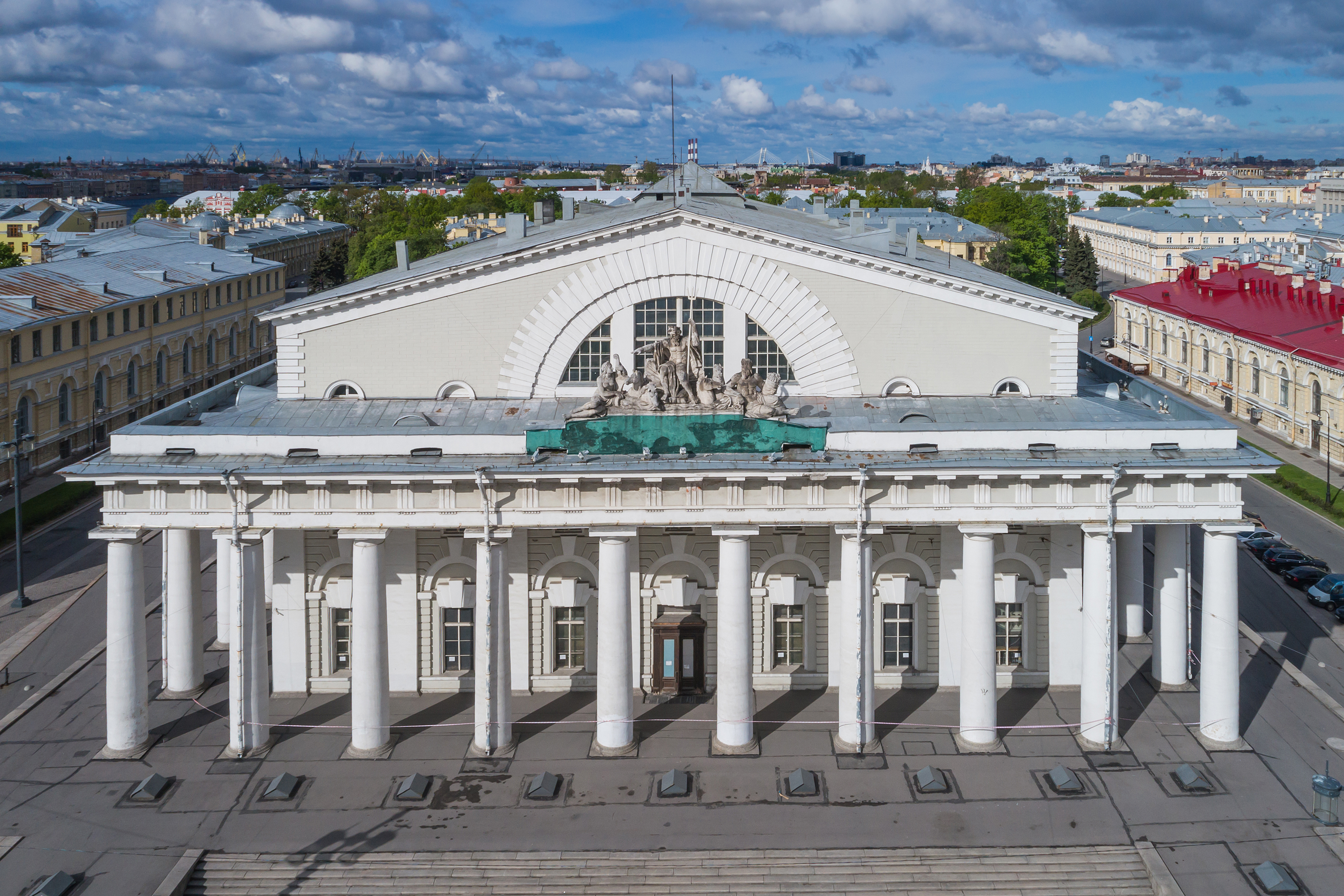
The Old Saint Petersburg Stock Exchange

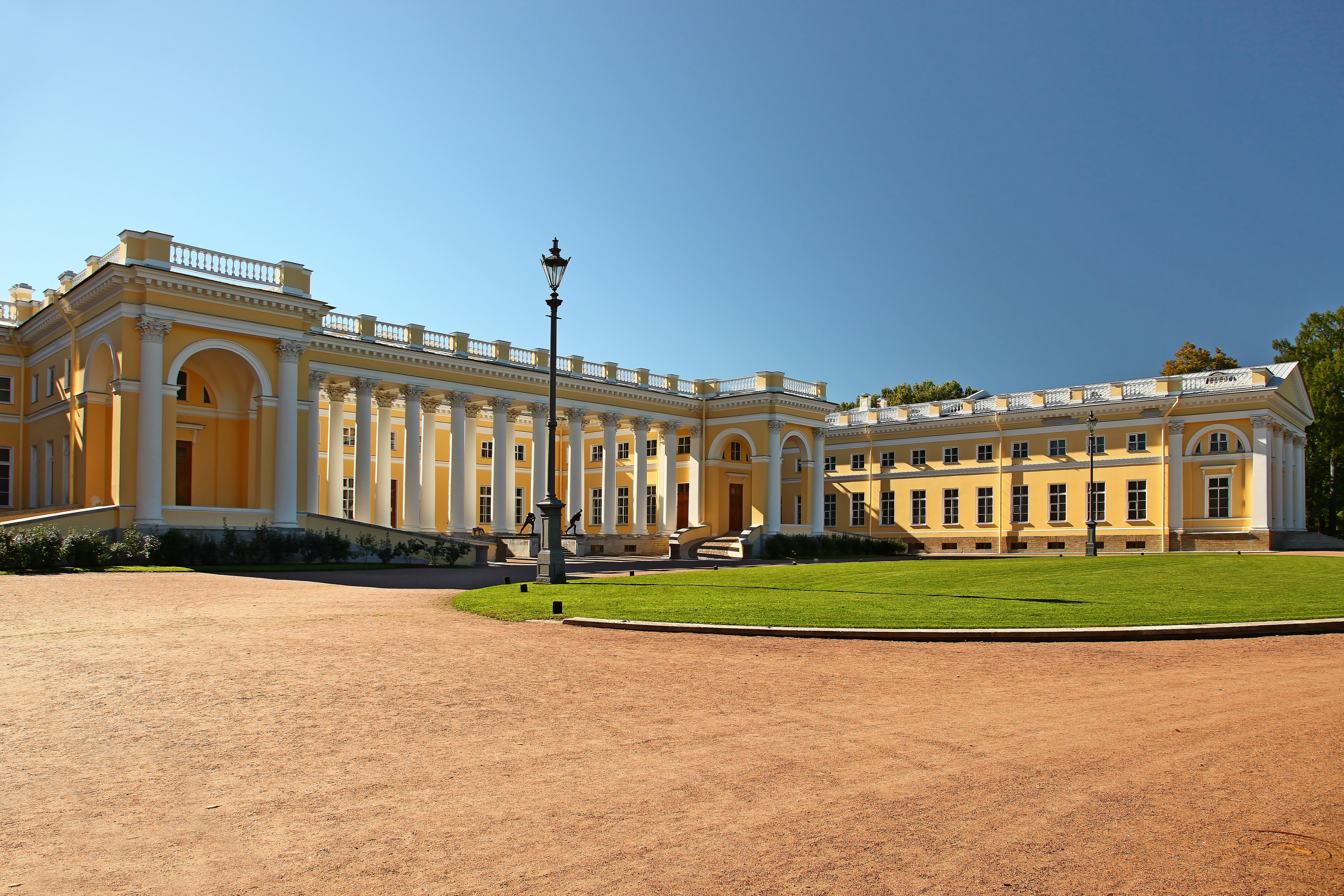
The Alexander Palace

Culture of Saint Petersburg

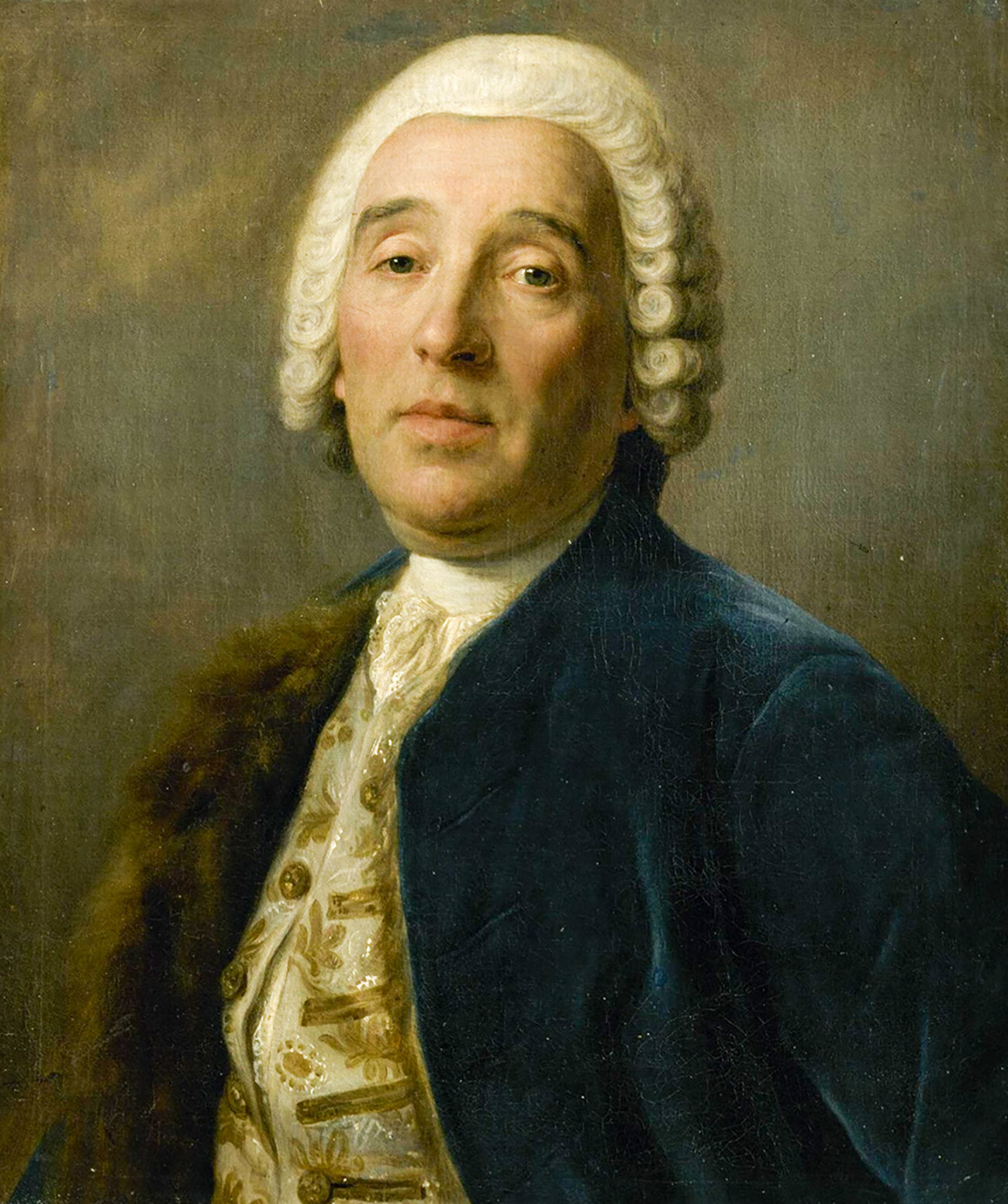
Francesco Bartolomeo Rastrelli, an Italian architect who contributed numerous landmarks to St. Petersburg

=== Arts in Saint Petersburg ===
==== Architecture of Saint Petersburg ====
Architecture of Saint Petersburg

- Art Nouveau architecture in Saint Petersburg
  - Singer House
- Baroque architecture in Saint Petersburg
  - Smolny Convent
  - Vorontsov Palace
- Fences in Saint Petersburg
- Gothic Revival architecture in Saint Petersburg
  - Gothic Chapel
- Greek Revival architecture in Saint Petersburg
  - Old Saint Petersburg Stock Exchange
- Neoclassical architecture in Saint Petersburg
  - Alexander Palace
  - General Staff Building
  - Trinity Cathedral
- Palladian architecture in Saint Petersburg
  - Smolny Institute
- Petrine Baroque in Saint Petersburg
  - Menshikov Palace
  - Twelve Collegia
  - Saints Peter and Paul Cathedral

==== Cinema of Saint Petersburg ====
- Festival of Festivals
- Saint Petersburg International Film Festival

==== Literature of Saint Petersburg ====
- Fyodor Dostoyevsky
  - Crime and Punishment
  - The Double
- Nikolai Gogol
  - The Nose
- Aleksandr Pushkin
- Ivan Turgenev
- National Library of Russia

==== Music and ballet of Saint Petersburg ====
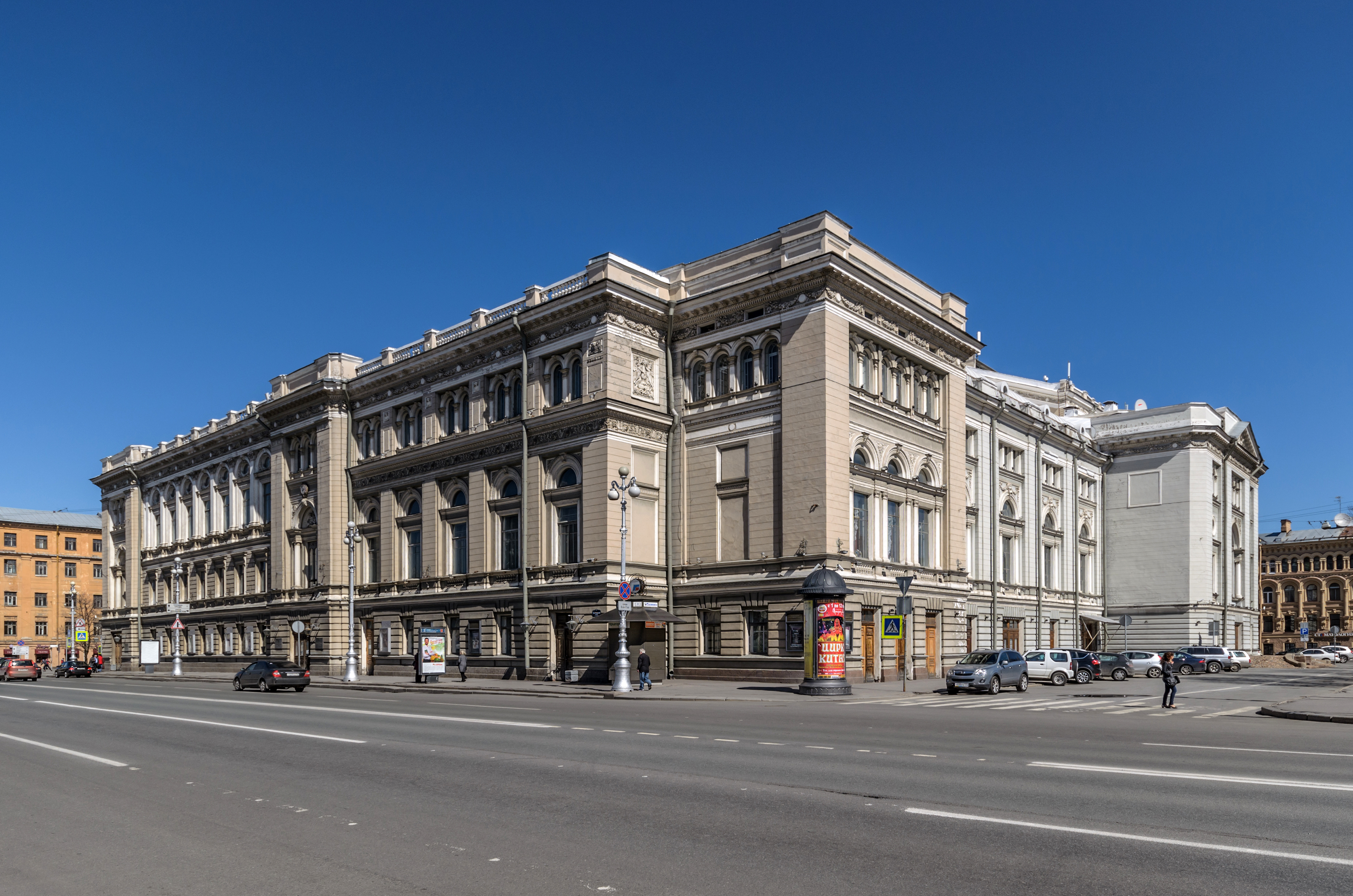
Saint Petersburg Conservatory

- Ballet of Saint Petersburg
  - Mariinsky Ballet
    - Vaganova Academy of Russian Ballet
  - St Petersburg Ballet Theatre

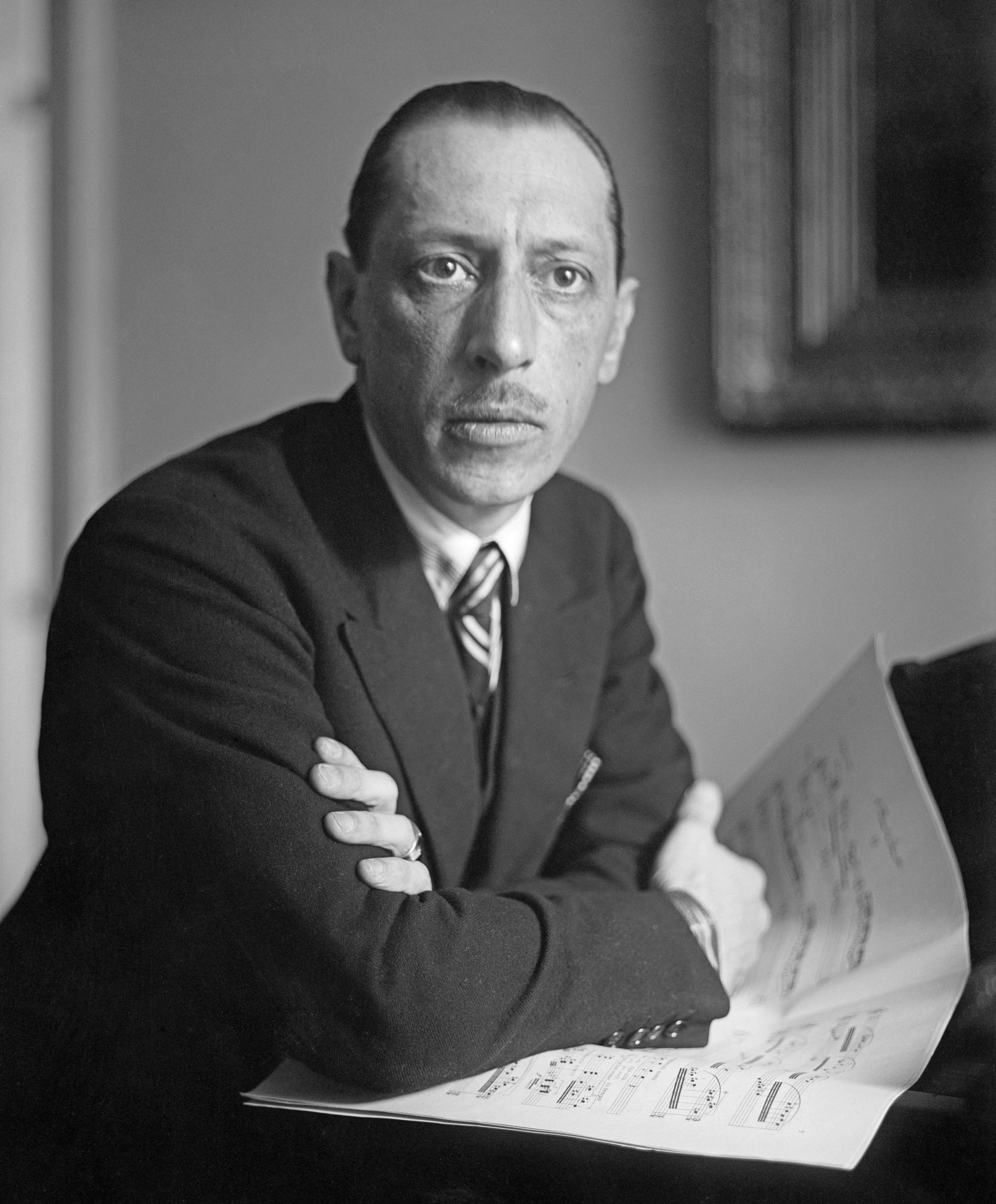
Igor Stravinsky, considered one of the most important composers of the 20th century

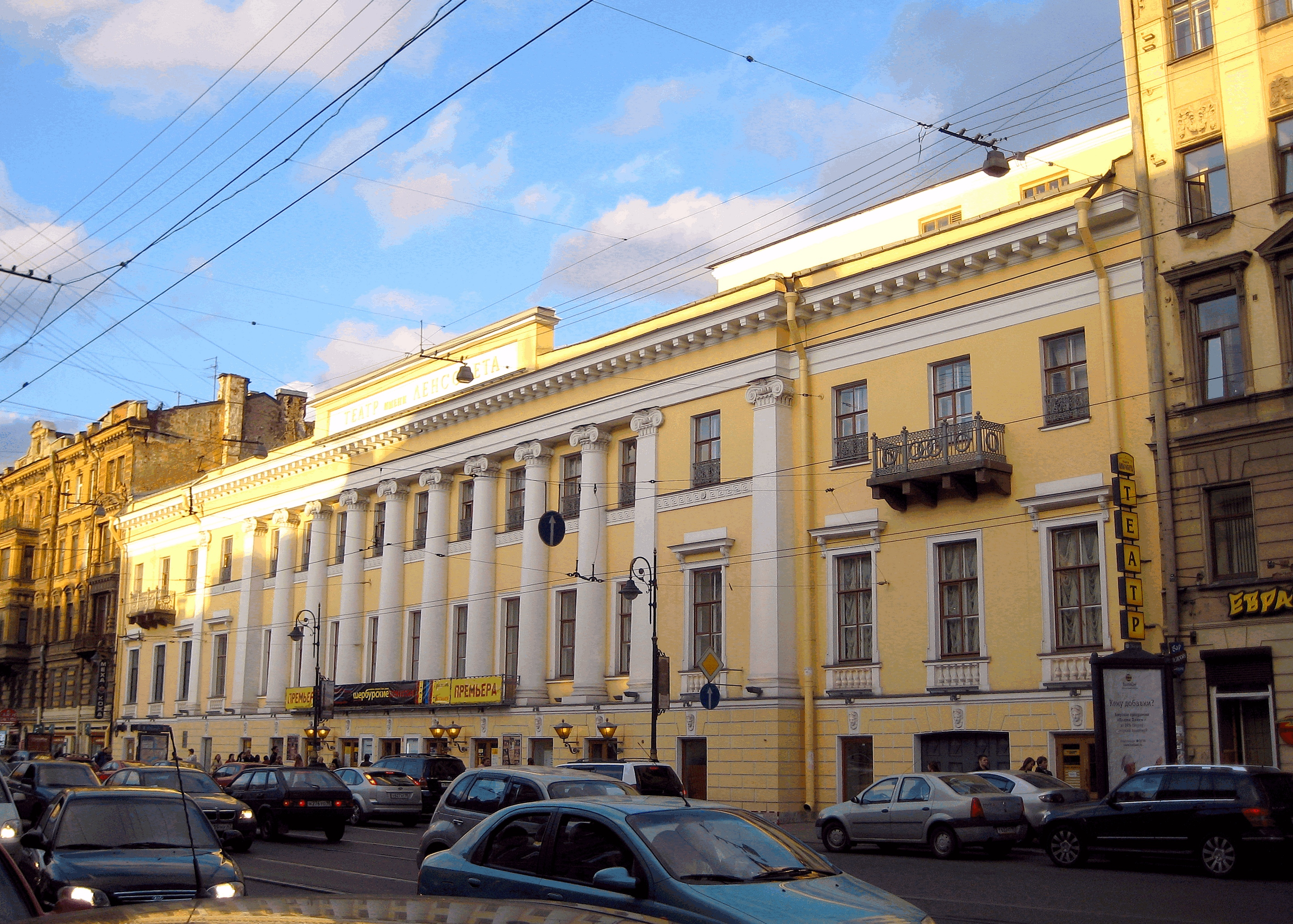
Saint Petersburg Lensoviet Theatre

- Music of Saint Petersburg
  - Music schools in Saint Petersburg
    - Saint Petersburg Conservatory
  - Music venues in Saint Petersburg
    - Mariinsky Theatre
    - Mikhailovsky Theatre
    - Saint Petersburg Philharmonia
    - St. Petersburg Music Hall
  - Musical compositions dedicated to Saint Petersburg
    - Symphony No. 7 (Shostakovich)
  - Musical ensembles in Saint Petersburg
    - Saint Petersburg Academic Symphony Orchestra
    - Saint Petersburg Court Chapel
    - Saint Petersburg Philharmonic Orchestra
    - The Male Choir of St. Petersburg
  - Musicians from Saint Petersburg
    - Alexander Borodin
    - Victor Ewald
    - Alexander Glazunov
    - Alexander Serov
    - Dmitri Shostakovich
    - Igor Stravinsky
    - The Five

==== Theatre of Saint Petersburg ====
- Lensovet Theatre
- Teatralnaya laboratoriya

==== Visual arts of Saint Petersburg ====
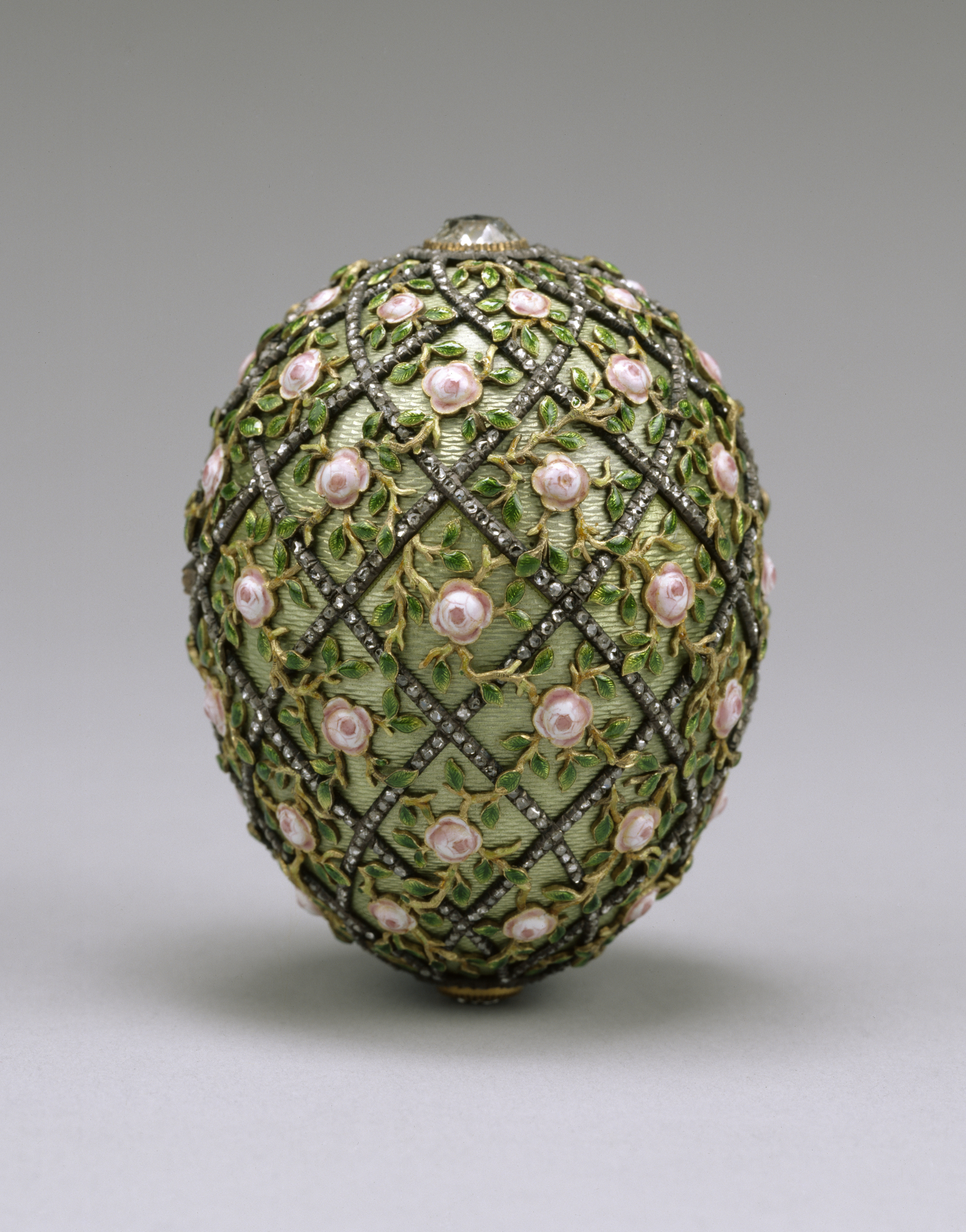
The Rose Trellis Egg made in Saint Petersburg in 1907

- Fine Art of Leningrad
- Leningrad School of Painting
- Painters of Saint Petersburg

Events in Saint Petersburg

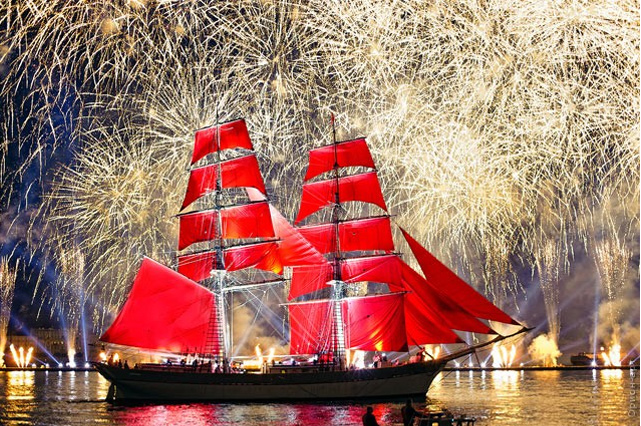
Scarlet Sails, a public event during the White Nights Festival

- White Nights Festival
  - Festival of Festivals
  - Scarlet Sails
  - White Nights International Marathon

Languages of Saint Petersburg

- Russian language
- Veps language

Media in Saint Petersburg

- Newspapers in Saint Petersburg
  - The St. Petersburg Times
- Radio and television in Saint Petersburg
  - Television and radio stations in Saint Petersburg

People from Saint Petersburg

- List of people from Saint Petersburg
  - George Balanchine
  - Peter Carl Fabergé
  - Ludvig Faddeev
  - Mikhail Kutuzov
  - Vladimir Nabokov

=== Religion in Saint Petersburg ===
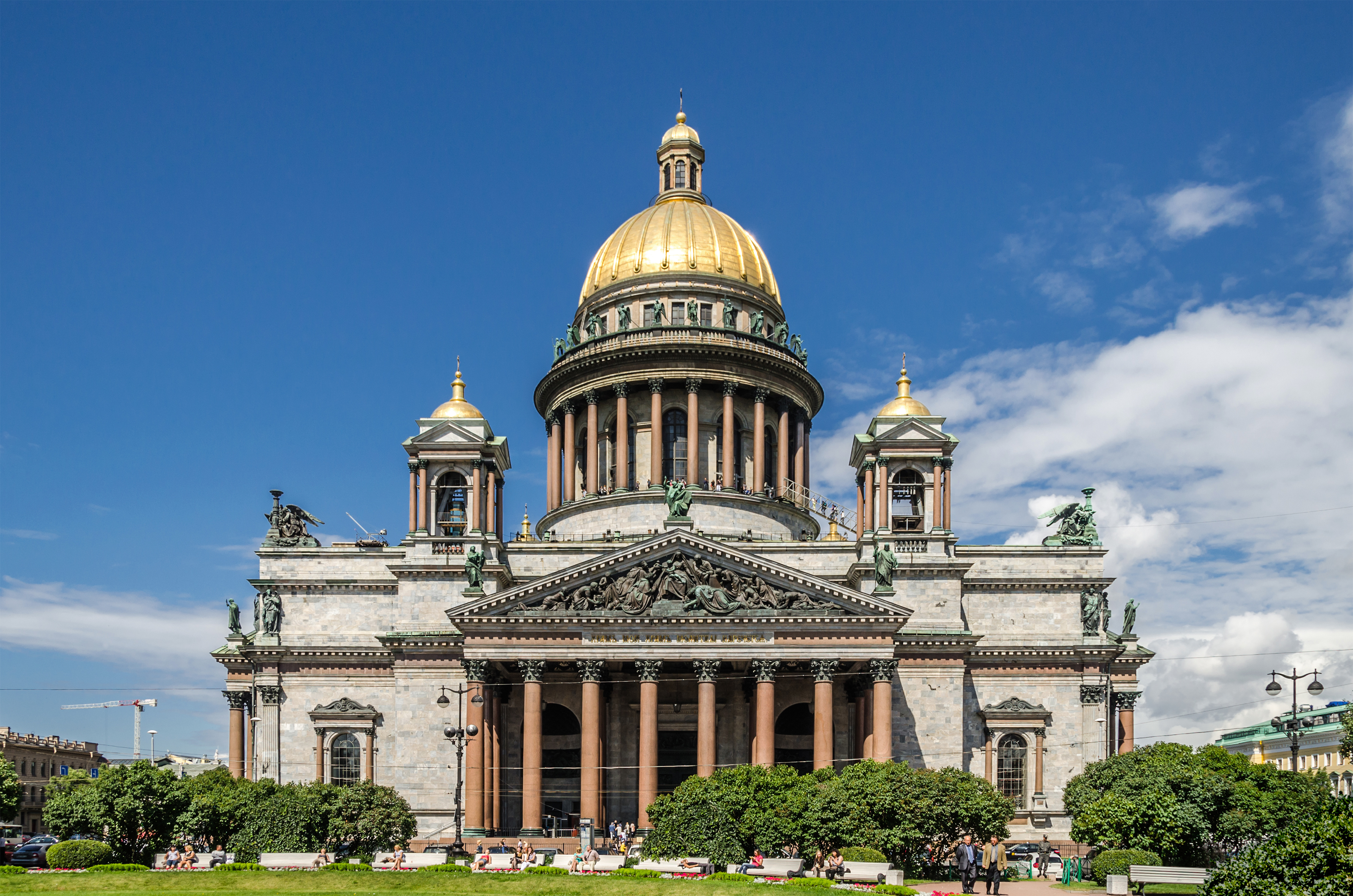
Saint Isaac's Cathedral, a Russian Orthodox Church

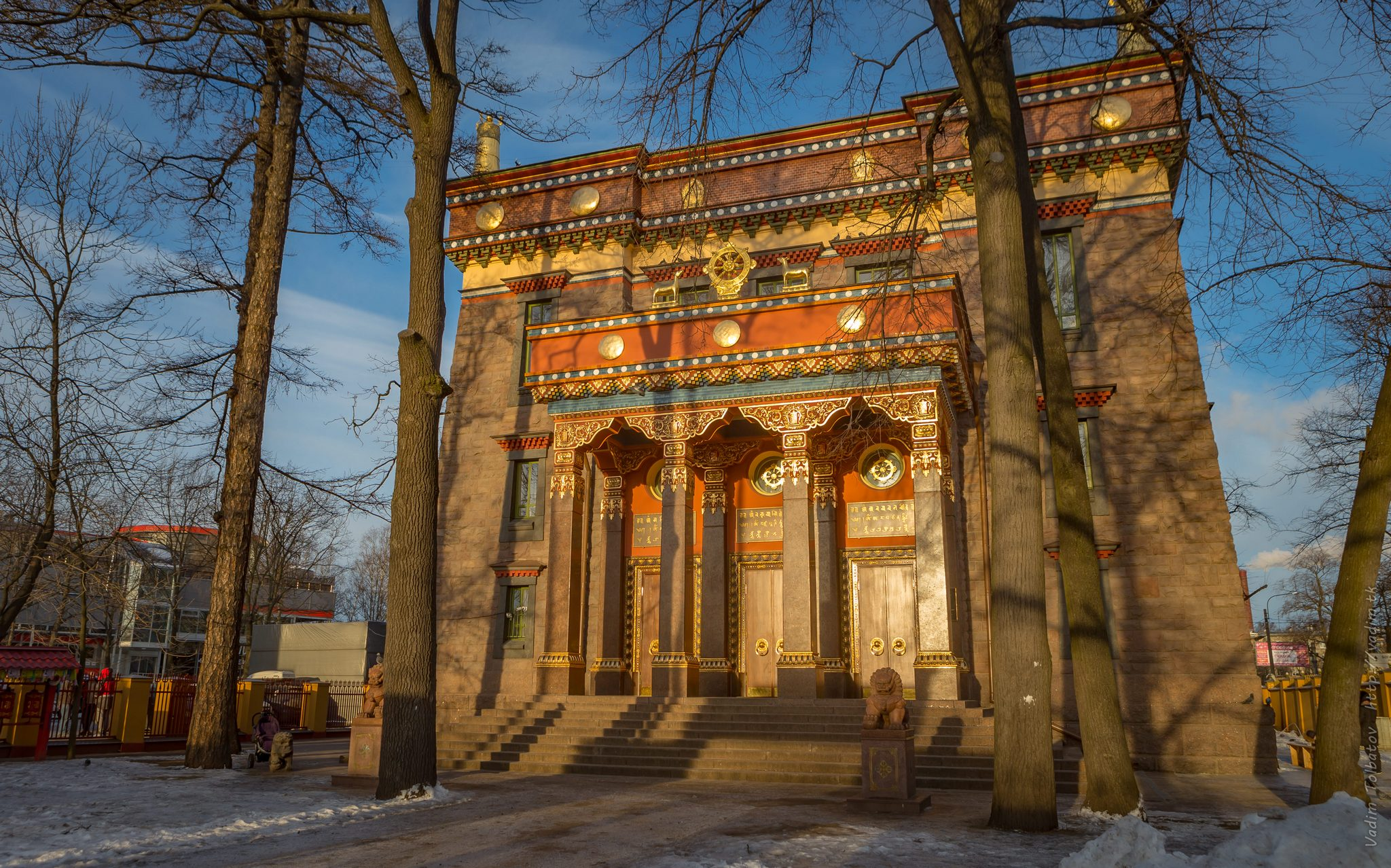
The Datsan Gunzechoinei

Religion in Saint Petersburg

- Catholicism in Saint Petersburg
  - Roman Catholic Diocese of Saint Petersburg
    - Church of St. Catherine
- Eastern Orthodoxy in Saint Petersburg
  - Transfiguration Cathedral
- Russian Orthodoxy in Saint Petersburg
  - Russian Orthodox Church
- Buddhism in Saint Petersburg
  - Datsan Gunzechoinei
- Islam in Saint Petersburg
  - Saint Petersburg Mosque
- Judaism in Saint Petersburg
  - Grand Choral Synagogue

=== Sports in Saint Petersburg ===
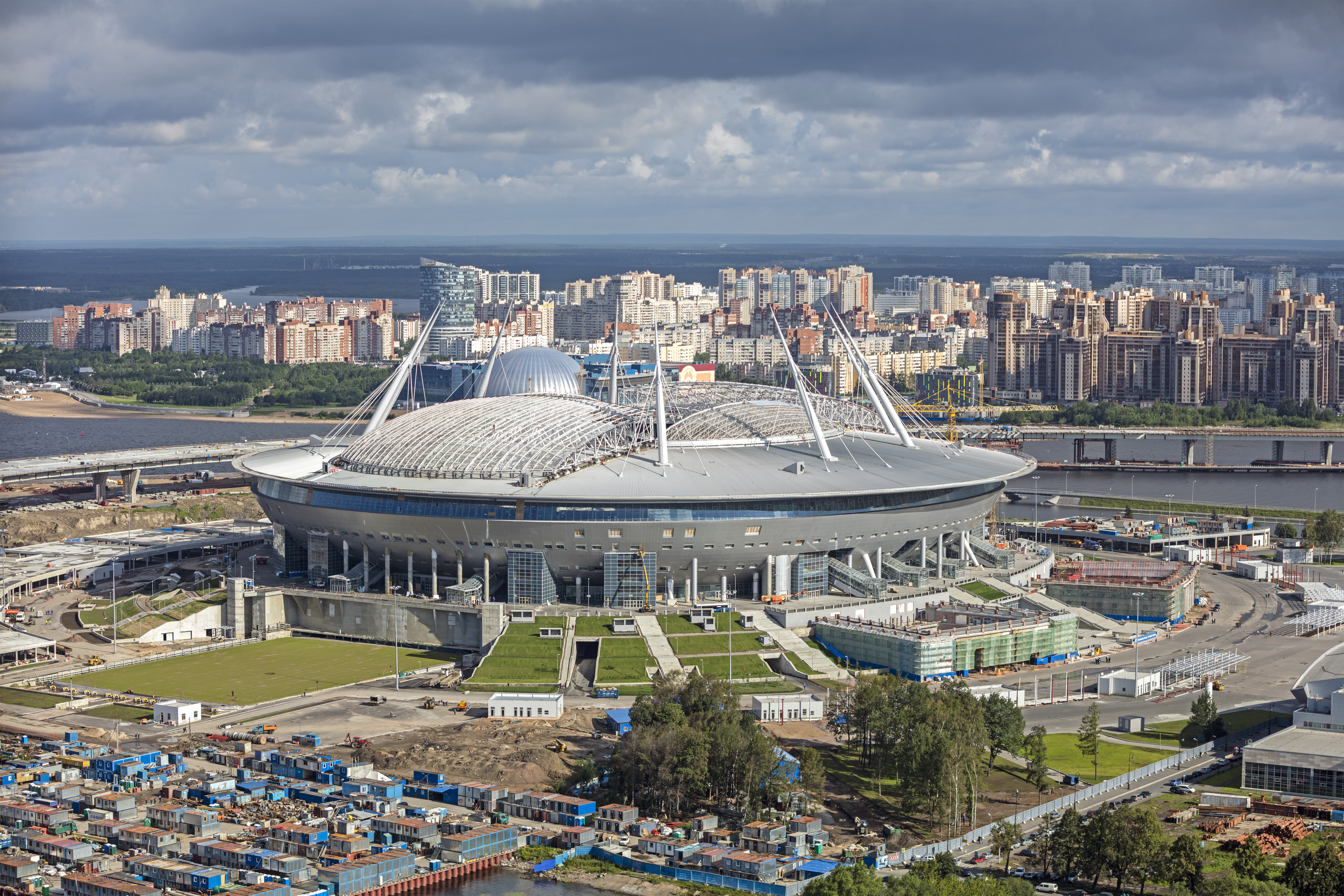
Krestovsky Stadium

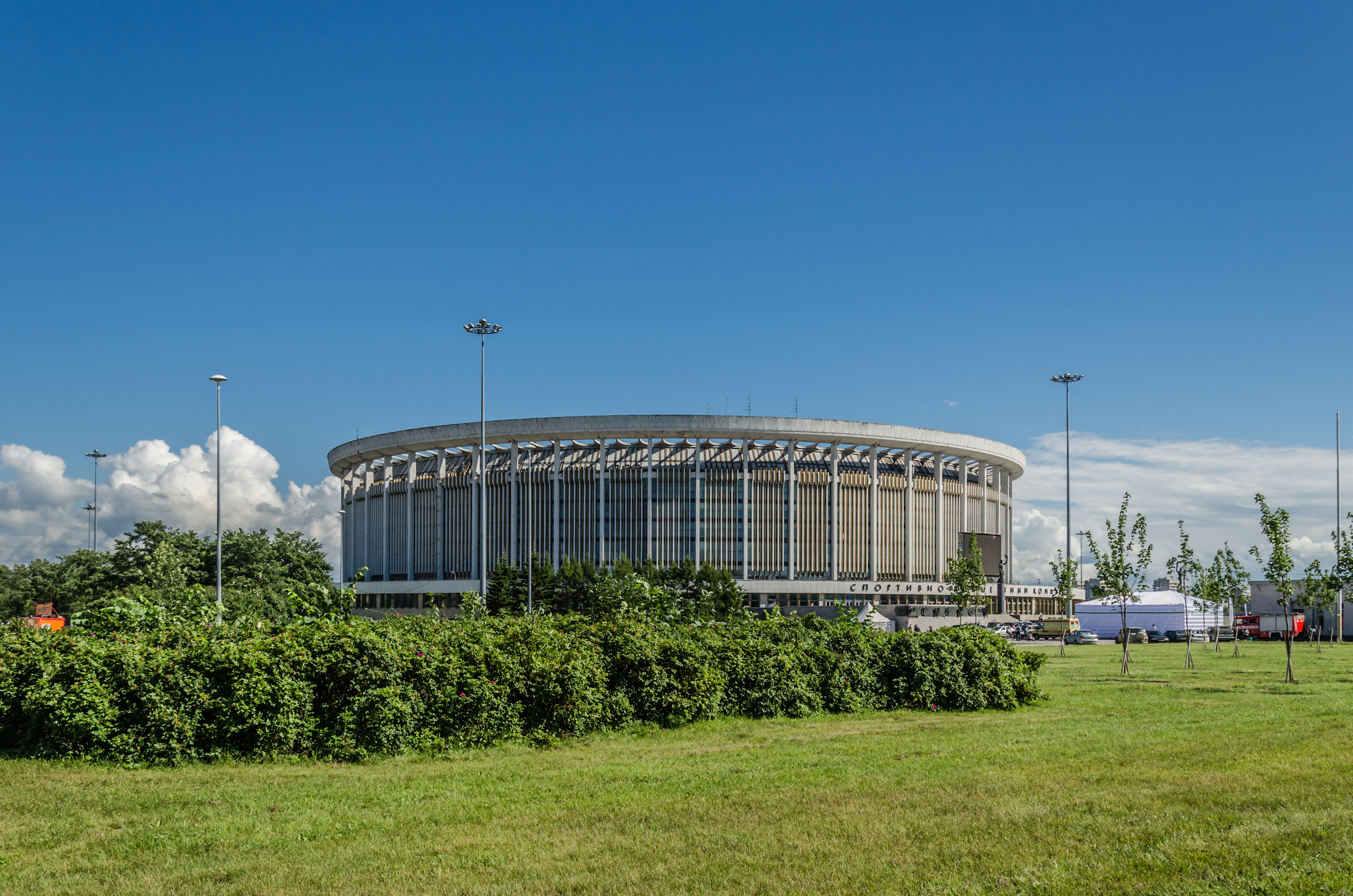
The Saint Petersburg Sports and Concert Complex

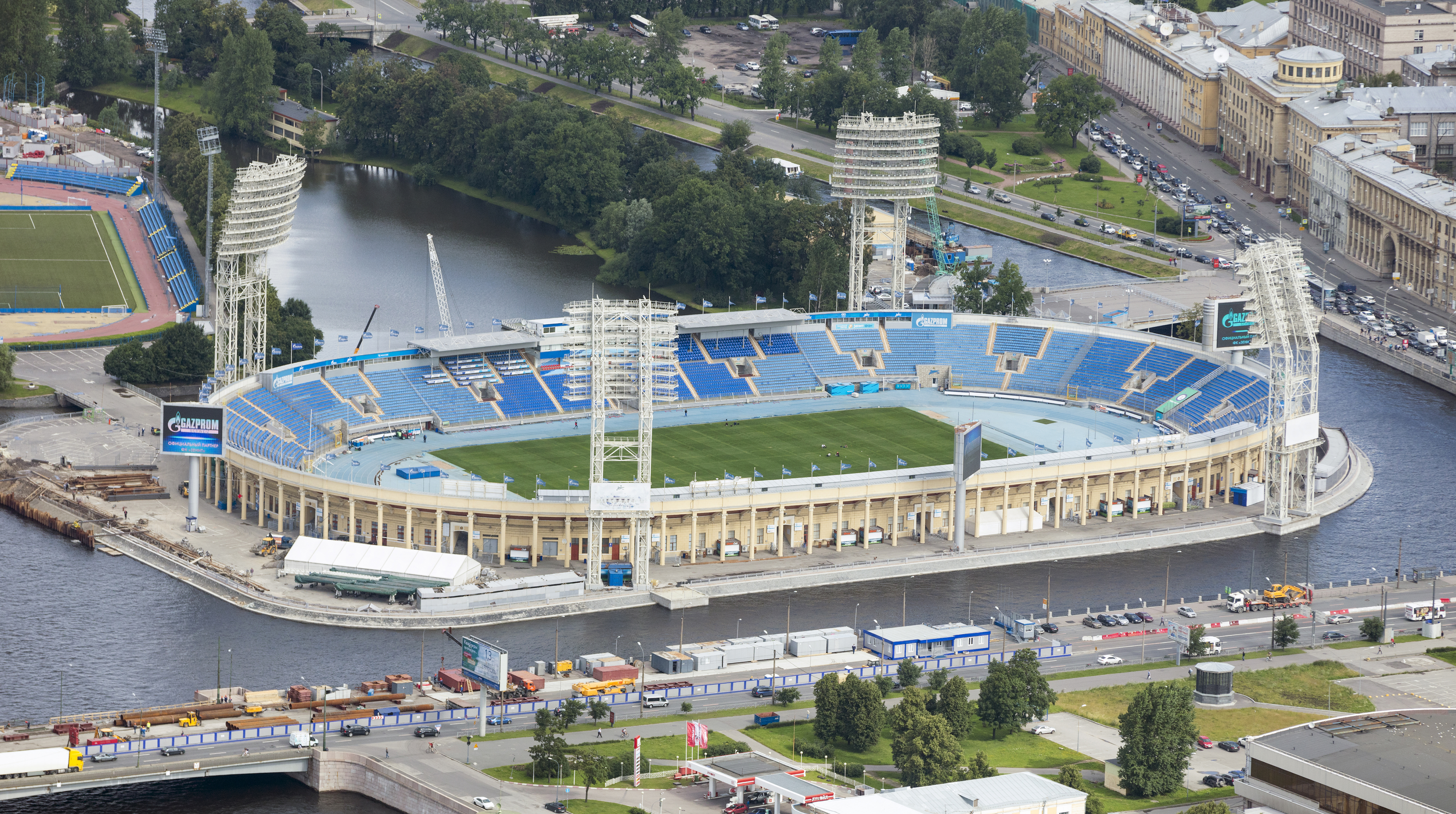
Petrovsky Stadium

Sport in Saint Petersburg

- Basketball in Saint Petersburg
  - BC Spartak Saint Petersburg
  - B.C. Zenit Saint Petersburg
- Football in Saint Petersburg
  - Association football in Saint Petersburg
    - FC Dynamo Saint Petersburg
    - FC Zenit Saint Petersburg
  - Saint Petersburg derby
- Ice hockey in Saint Petersburg
  - HC Dinamo Saint Petersburg
  - SKA Saint Petersburg
- Sports competitions in Saint Petersburg
  - 2006–07 Grand Prix of Figure Skating Final
  - Leningrad City Chess Championship
  - St. Petersburg Open
  - White Nights Marathon
- Sports venues in Saint Petersburg
  - Ice Palace
  - Krestovsky Stadium
  - Petrovsky Stadium
  - Saint Petersburg Sports and Concert Complex
  - Yubileyny Sports Palace

== Economy and infrastructure of Saint Petersburg ==
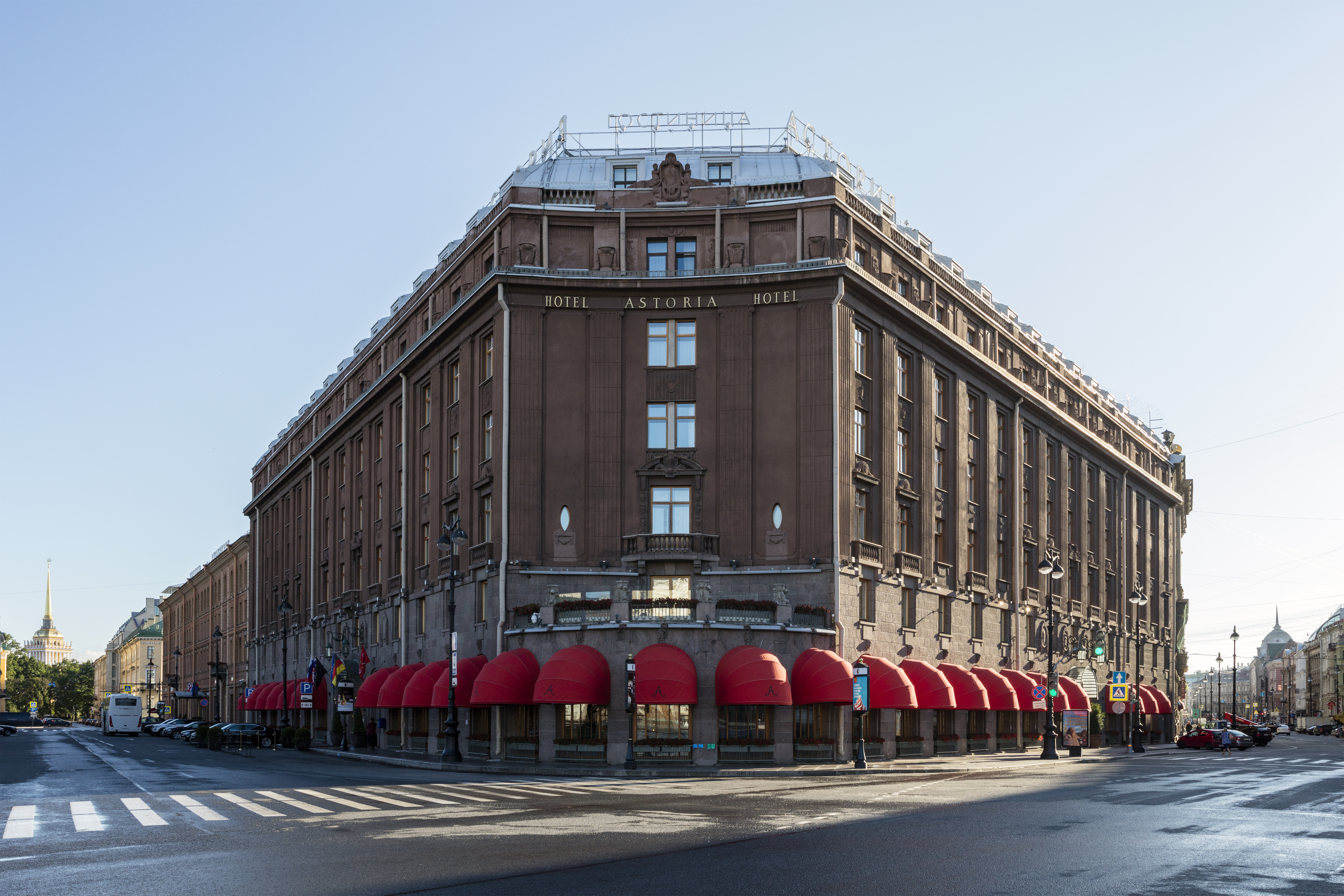
Hotel Astoria

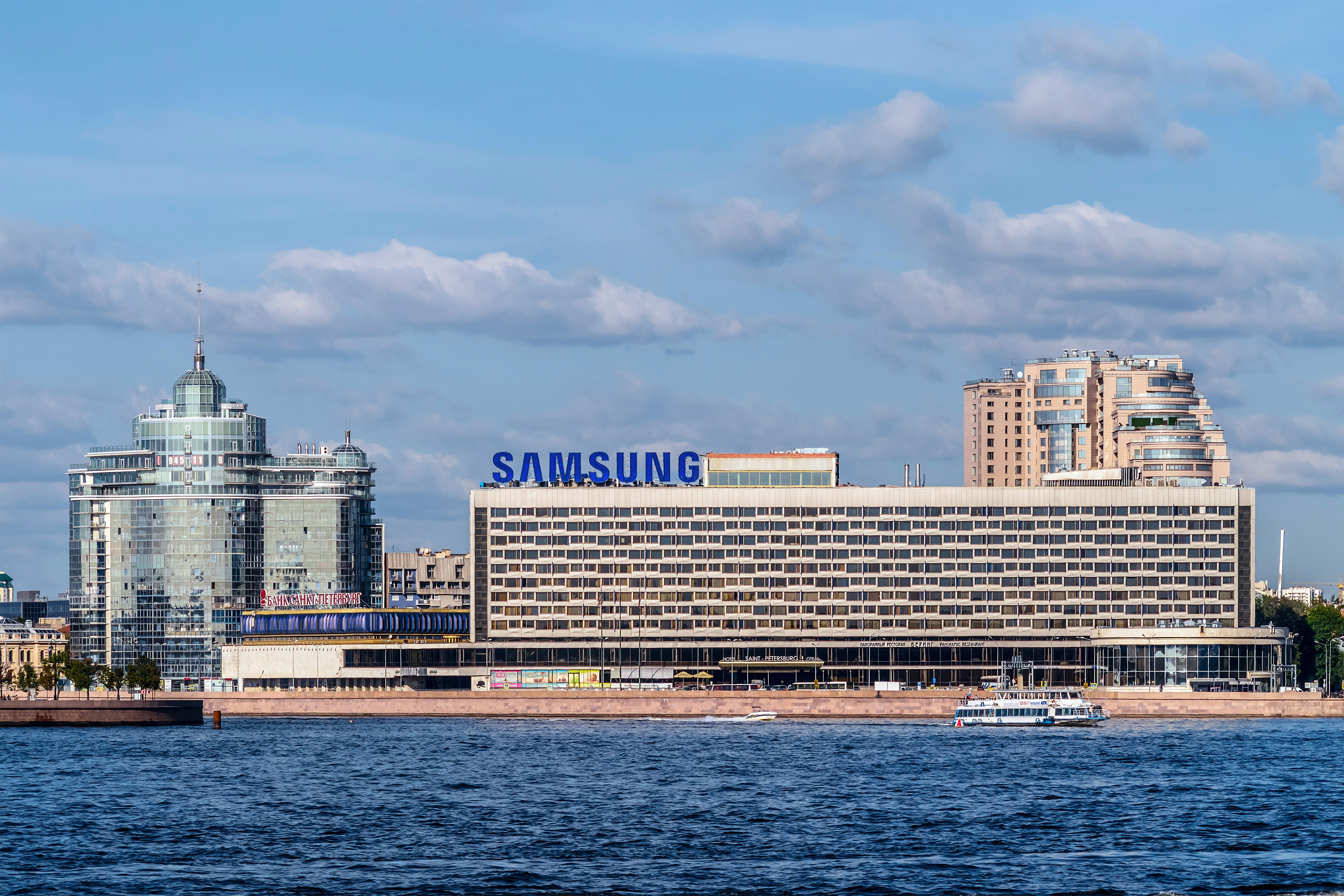
The Saint Petersburg hotel

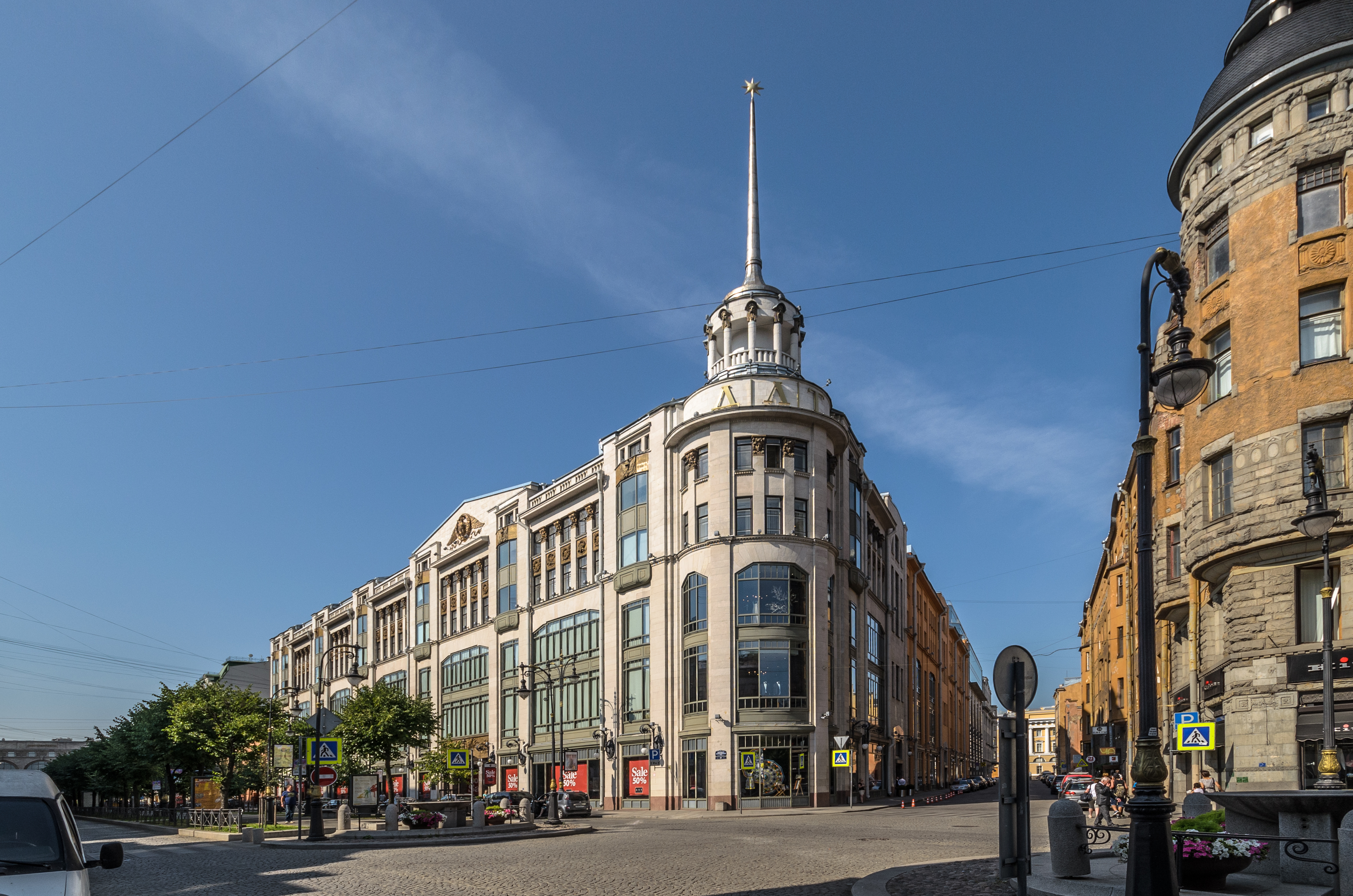
The DLT department store

Economy of Saint Petersburg

- Financial services in Saint Petersburg
  - Bank Saint Petersburg
  - Saint Petersburg Stock Exchange
- Hotels in Saint Petersburg
  - Angleterre Hotel
  - Corinthia Hotel St. Petersburg
  - Grand Hotel Europe
  - Hotel Astoria
  - Four Seasons Hotel Lion Palace
  - Oktyabrskaya Hotel
  - Saint Petersburg
- Restaurants and cafés in Saint Petersburg
  - Literaturnoye Kafe
- Shipbuilding industry
  - Admiralty Shipyard
  - Almaz Shipbuilding Company
- Shopping malls and markets in Saint Petersburg
  - Shopping malls in Saint Petersburg
    - DLT
    - Galeria
    - Great Gostiny Dvor
    - Passage
- Tourism in Saint Petersburg
  - Landmarks of Saint Petersburg

=== Transportation in Saint Petersburg ===
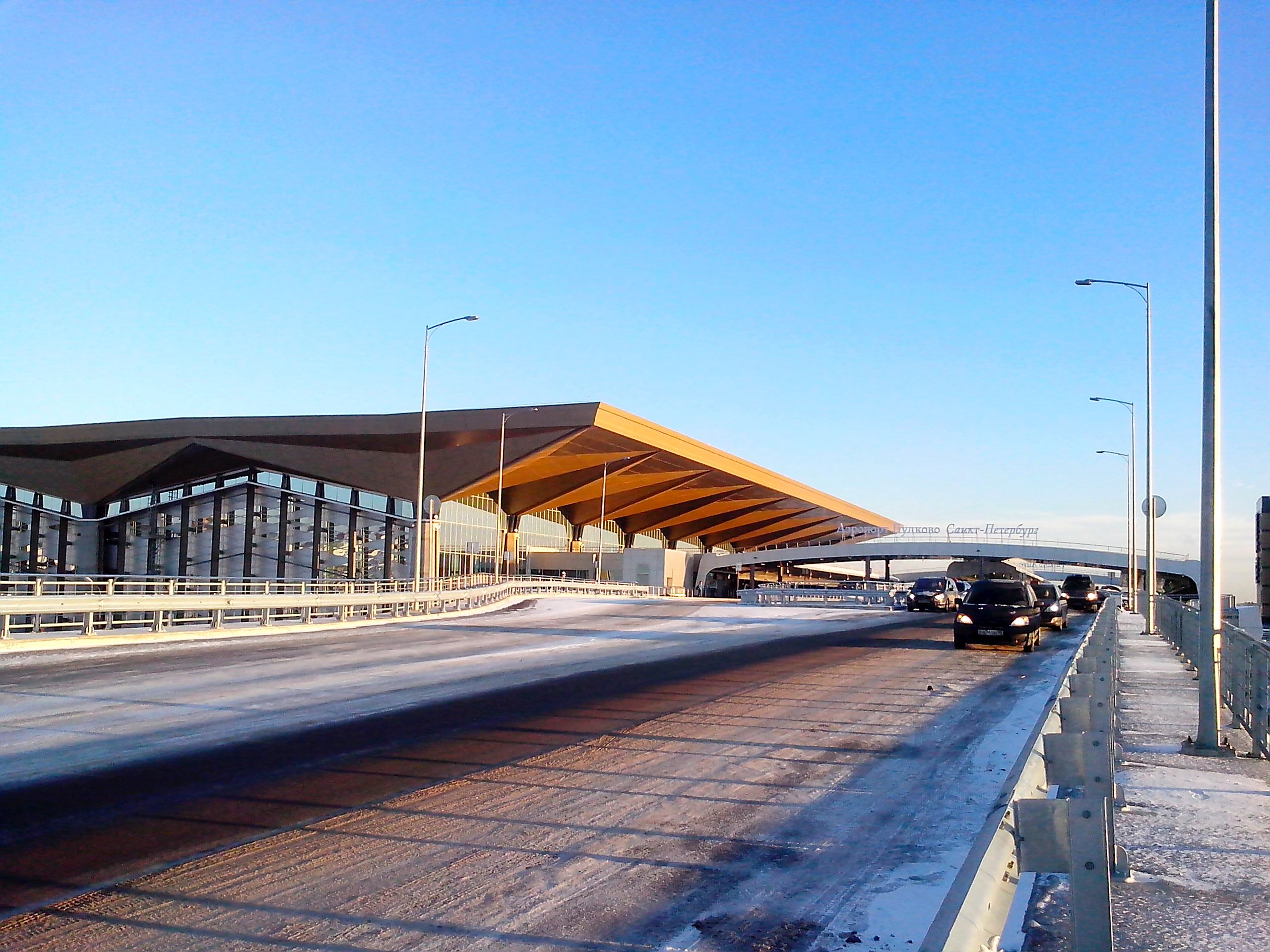
Pulkovo Airport

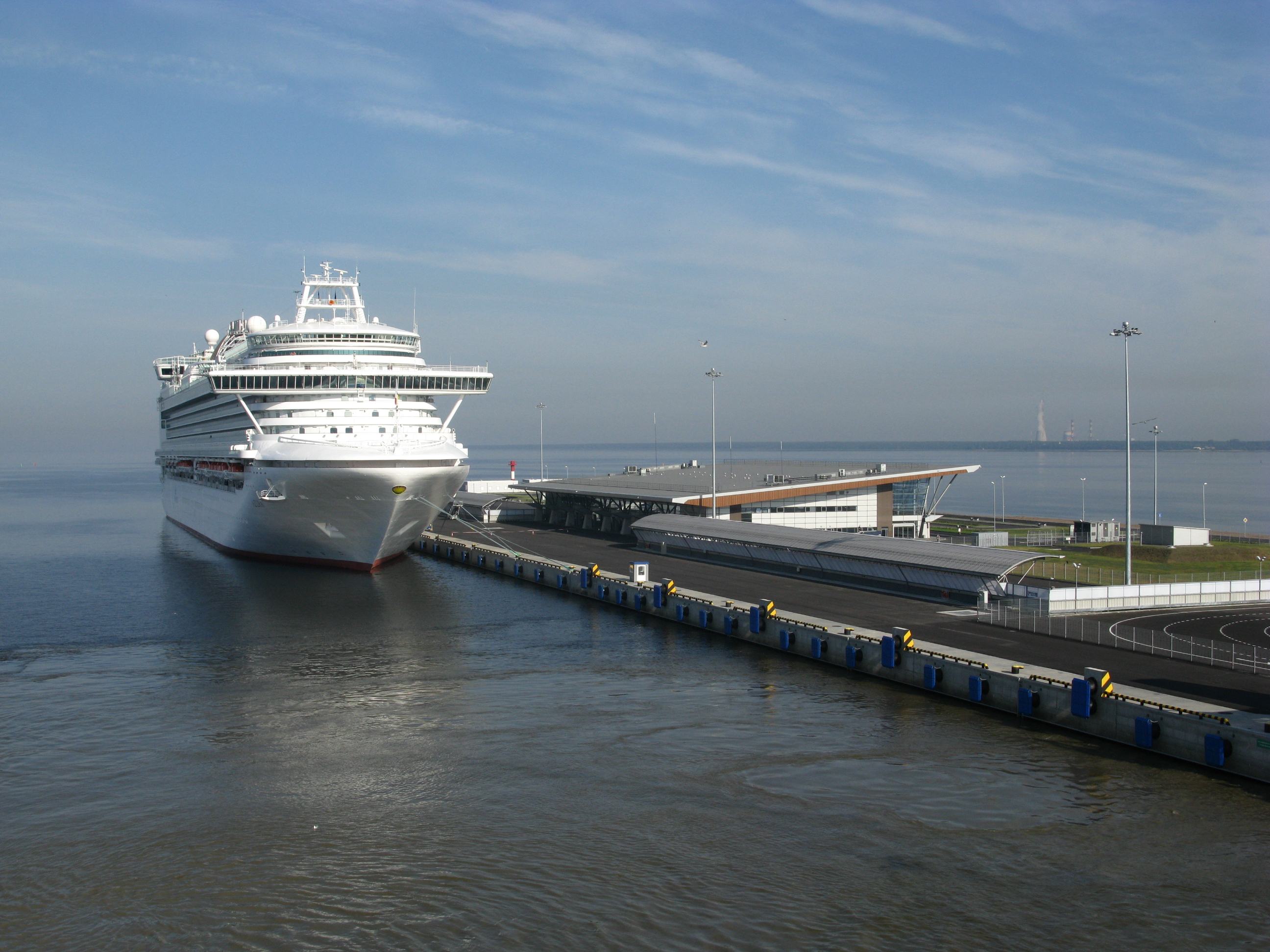
Cruise ship at Passenger Port of St. Petersburg

Transportation in Saint Petersburg

- Public transport in Saint Petersburg
  - Public transport operators in Saint Petersburg
- Air transport in Saint Petersburg
  - Airports in Saint Petersburg
    - Pulkovo Airport
- Maritime transport in Saint Petersburg
  - Ports and harbours in Saint Petersburg
    - Big port Saint Petersburg
    - Passenger Port of St. Petersburg
  - Shipping lines serving Saint Petersburg
    - Baltic Sea Shipping Company
- Road transport in Saint Petersburg
  - Bus transport in Saint Petersburg
  - Central Arc Thoroughfare
  - Saint Petersburg Ring Road

==== Rail transport in Saint Petersburg ====
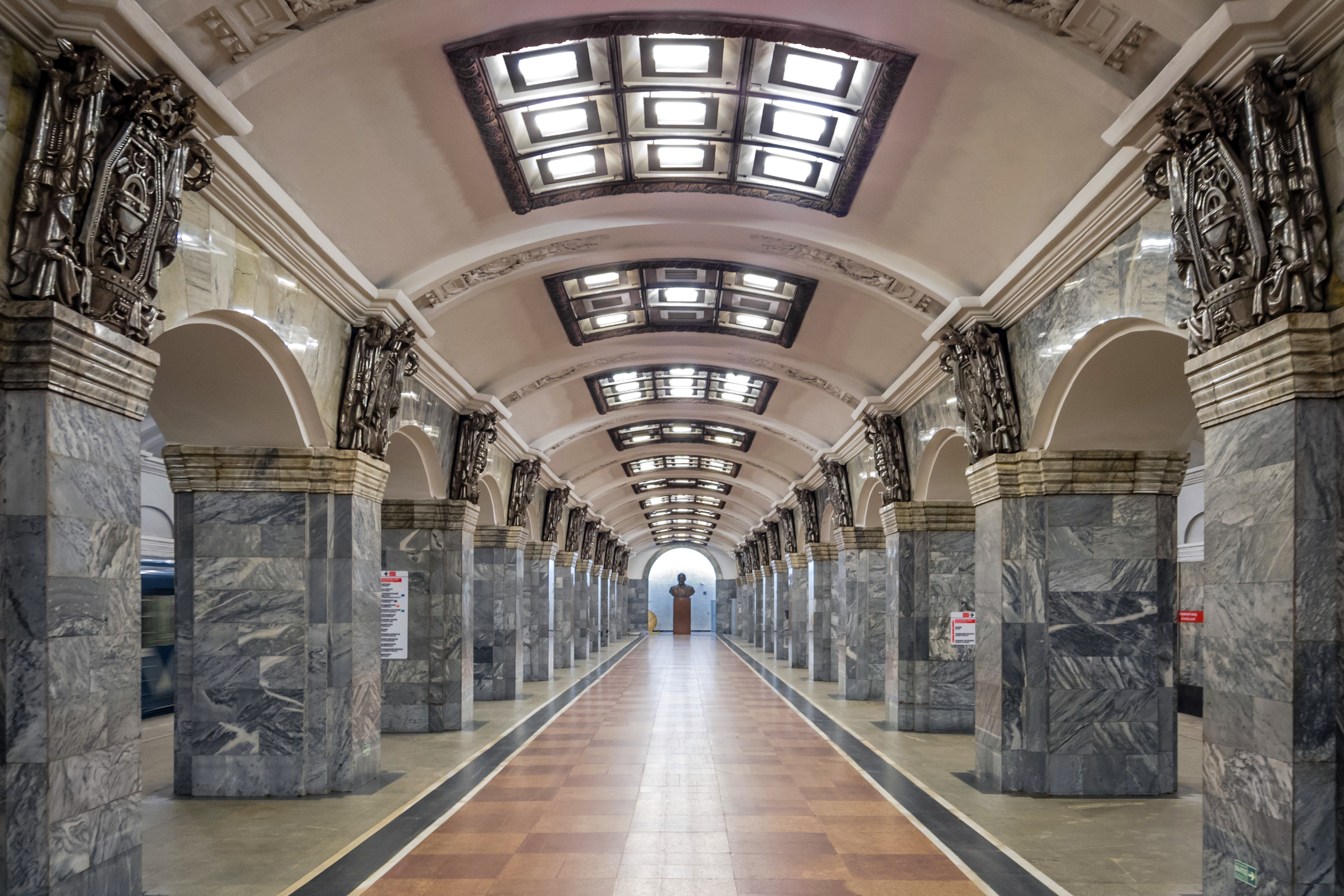
Kirovsky Zavod metrostation

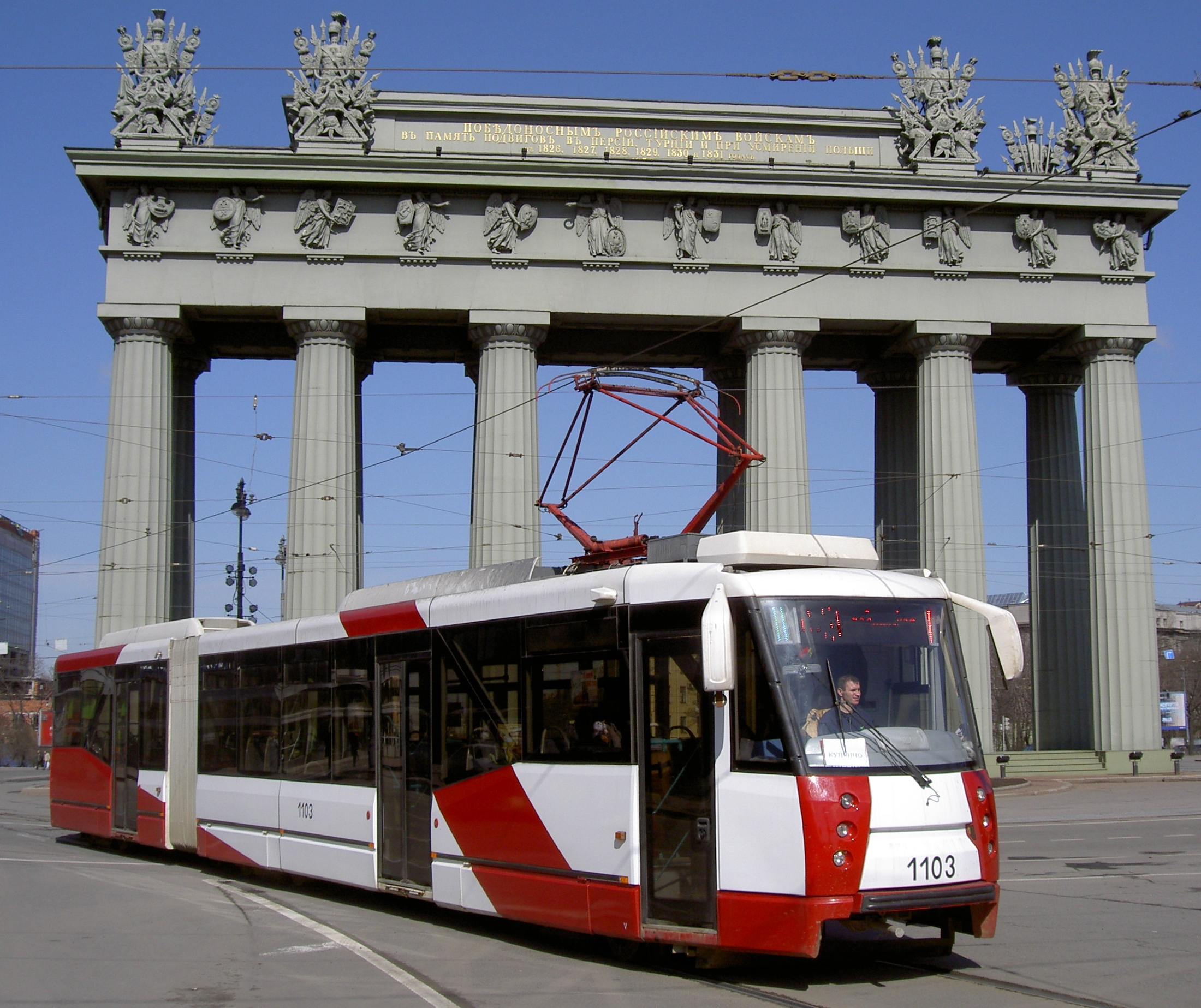
Tram on Moscow Gate Square

Rail transport in Saint Petersburg

- Railway stations in Saint Petersburg
  - Baltiysky railway station
  - Finland Station
    - Riihimäki–Saint Petersburg railway
  - Ladozhsky railway station
  - Moskovsky railway station
  - Vitebsky railway station
- Saint Petersburg Metro
    - List of Saint Petersburg Metro stations
- Trams in Saint Petersburg
  - Vasileostrovsky tram depot

== Education in Saint Petersburg ==
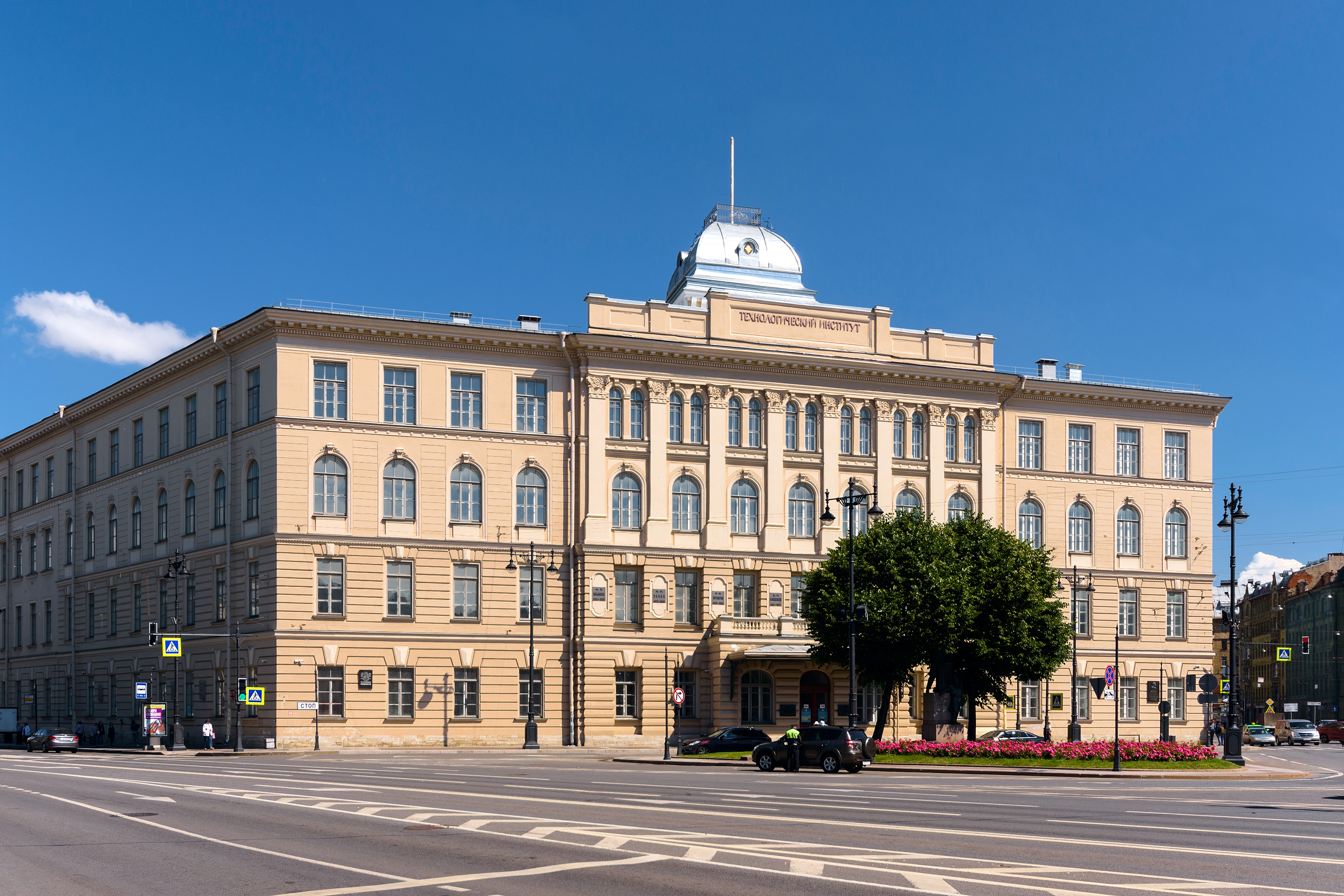
The Saint Petersburg State Institute of Technology

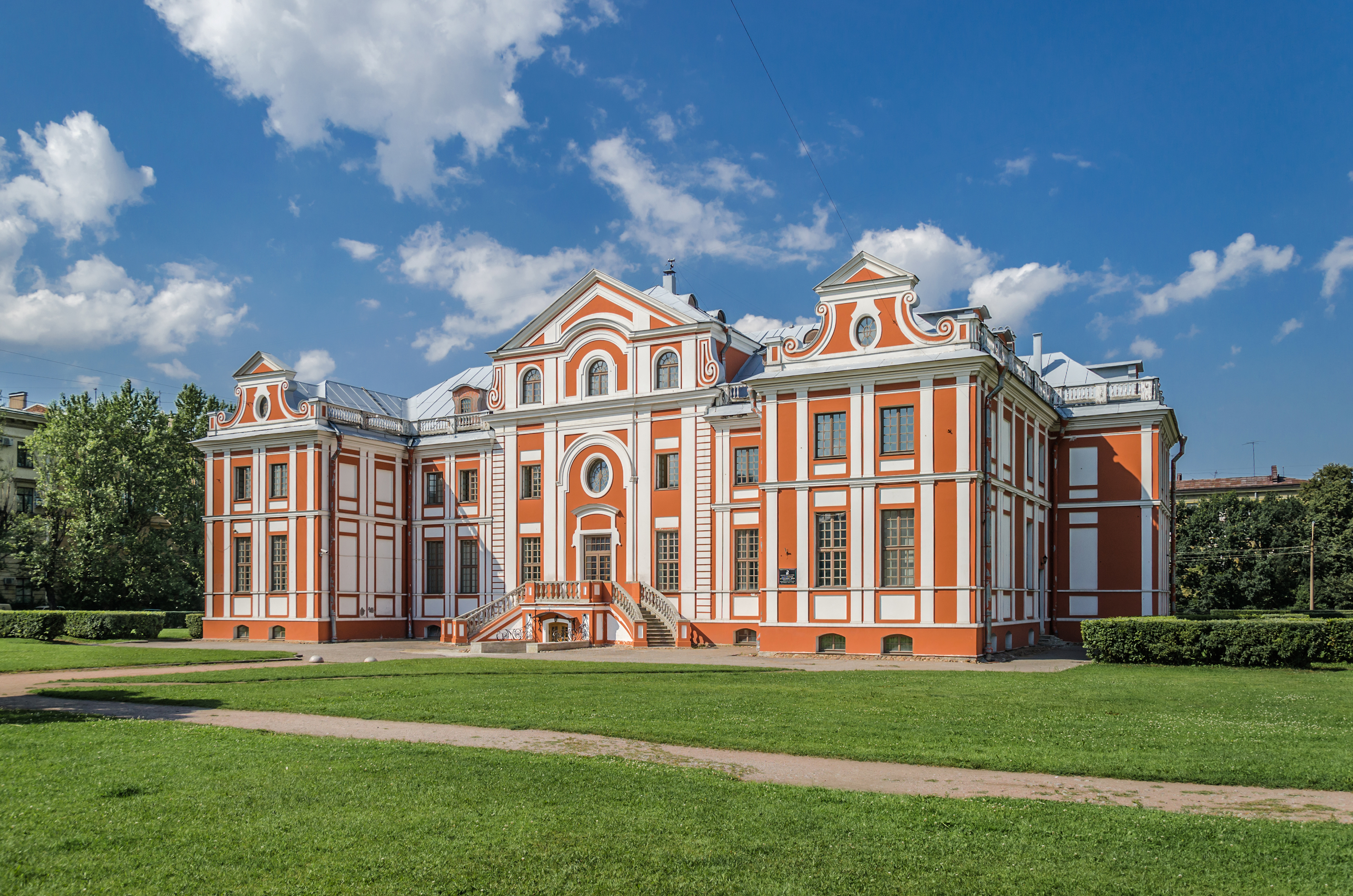
Kikin Hall

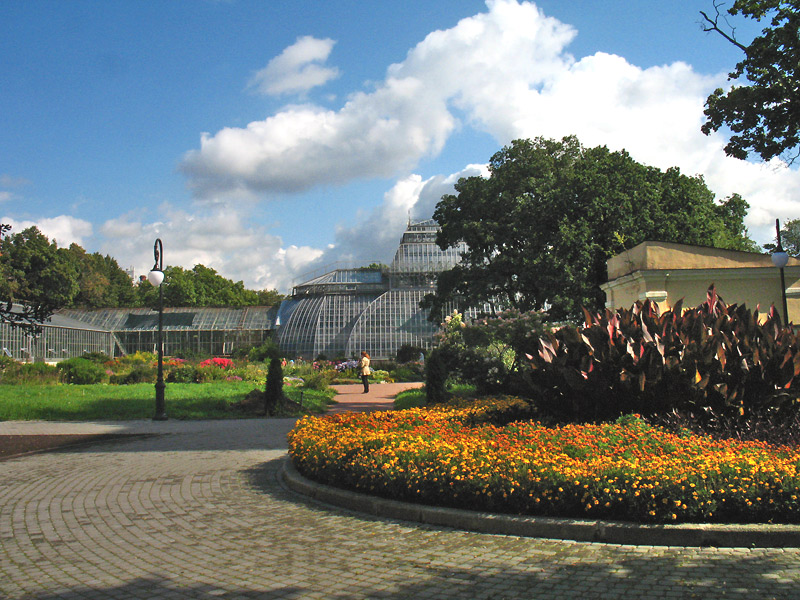
Komarov Botanical Institute, the botanical garden

Education in Saint Petersburg

- Primary schools in Saint Petersburg
  - St Petersburg Classical Gymnasium
- Secondary schools in Saint Petersburg
  - Karl May School
  - Saint Peter's School
  - Saint Petersburg Lyceum 30
  - Saint Petersburg Lyceum 239
  - The Second Saint Petersburg Gymnasium
  - Tavricheskaya Art School
- Higher education and academic institutions in Saint Petersburg
  - Music schools
    - Kikin Hall
    - Saint Petersburg Conservatory
  - Universities in Saint Petersburg
    - Herzen University
    - Peter the Great St. Petersburg Polytechnic University
    - Saint Petersburg State University
    - Saint-Petersburg State University of Architecture and Civil Engineering
    - Saint-Petersburg State University of Culture and Arts
    - Saint Petersburg State University of Economics and Finance
  - Research institutes in Saint Petersburg
    - Arctic and Antarctic Research Institute
    - Bekhterev Psychoneurological Institute
    - Komarov Botanical Institute
    - Krylov State Research Center

== Healthcare in Saint Petersburg ==
- Hospitals in Saint Petersburg
  - City hospital No. 40

== See also ==
- Outline of geography
