= Lazarevsky Bridge =

Cable-stayed bridge in Saint Petersburg, Russia

Lazarevsky Bridge Лазаревский мост
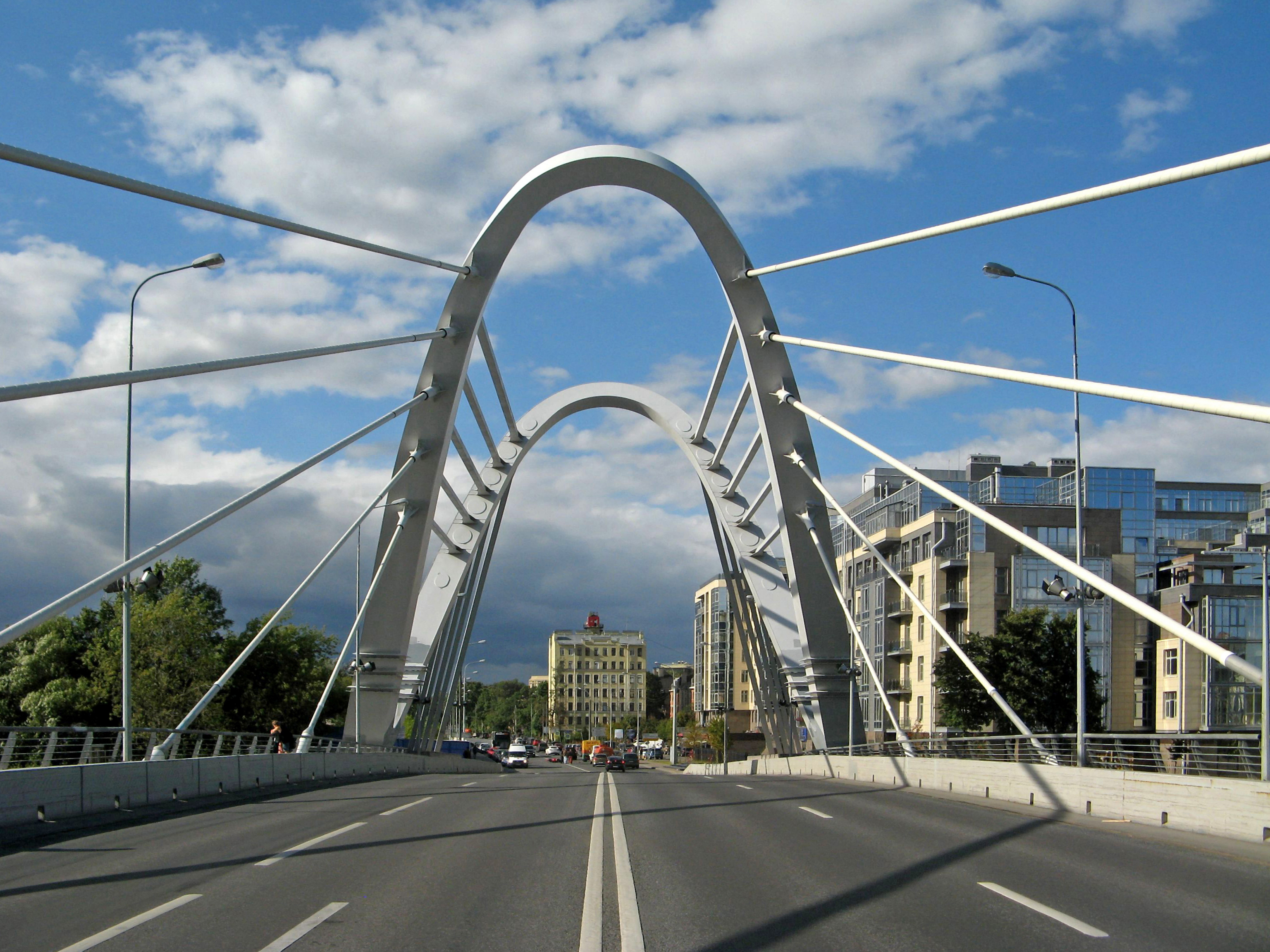
- Coordinates: 59.5755°N 30.1625°E
- Carries: Pionerskaya ul.
- Crosses: Little Nevka River
- Locale: Saint Petersburg, Russia
- Next upstream: Bolshoi Krestovsky Bridge
- Next downstream: Bolshoi Petrovsky Bridge

Characteristics
- Design: Cable-stayed
- Total length: 163 m
- Width: 22,5 m
- No. of lanes: 4

History
- Construction start: 1947
- Opened: 1949; 76 years ago
- Rebuilt: 2008-2009

Lazarevsky Bridge is a cable-stayed bridge located in St. Petersburg, Russia. It crosses the Little Nevka River, connecting Krestovsky Island and Petrogradsky Island. It is near Bolshoi Krestovsky Bridge (upstream), and Bolshoi Petrovsky Bridge (downstream). The bridge carries four lanes of road traffic and features an asymmetric design, with cable stays anchored to a pylon on the Krestovsky Island side.

== History ==
The first bridge was built because of the construction of the Kirov Stadium in the Maritime Victory Park in the western part of Krestovsky Island. The bridge was initially named Koltovsky because of a historic name of the nearby area; it was renamed to in 1952 to Lazarevsky, in honor of Admiral M.P. Lazarev.

In 1947–1949, a tram and pedestrian bridge was built using the design produced by the engineers V.V. Blazhevich and A.D. Saperstein of Lengiproinzhproekt. Construction was led by E. V. Dimant and V. E. Efimov. This first version of the bridge had 11 spans. Supports were made of wood and steel, spans - steel girder. The length of the bridge was 141.3 m, width - 11.3 m.

In 1976, a major renovation of the bridge was carried out. The wooden fence walls were replaced with reinforced concrete slabs and metal piles. in 1998, crossbeams, wooden railings, drains, sidewalk decking and the pavement between tracks were replaced.

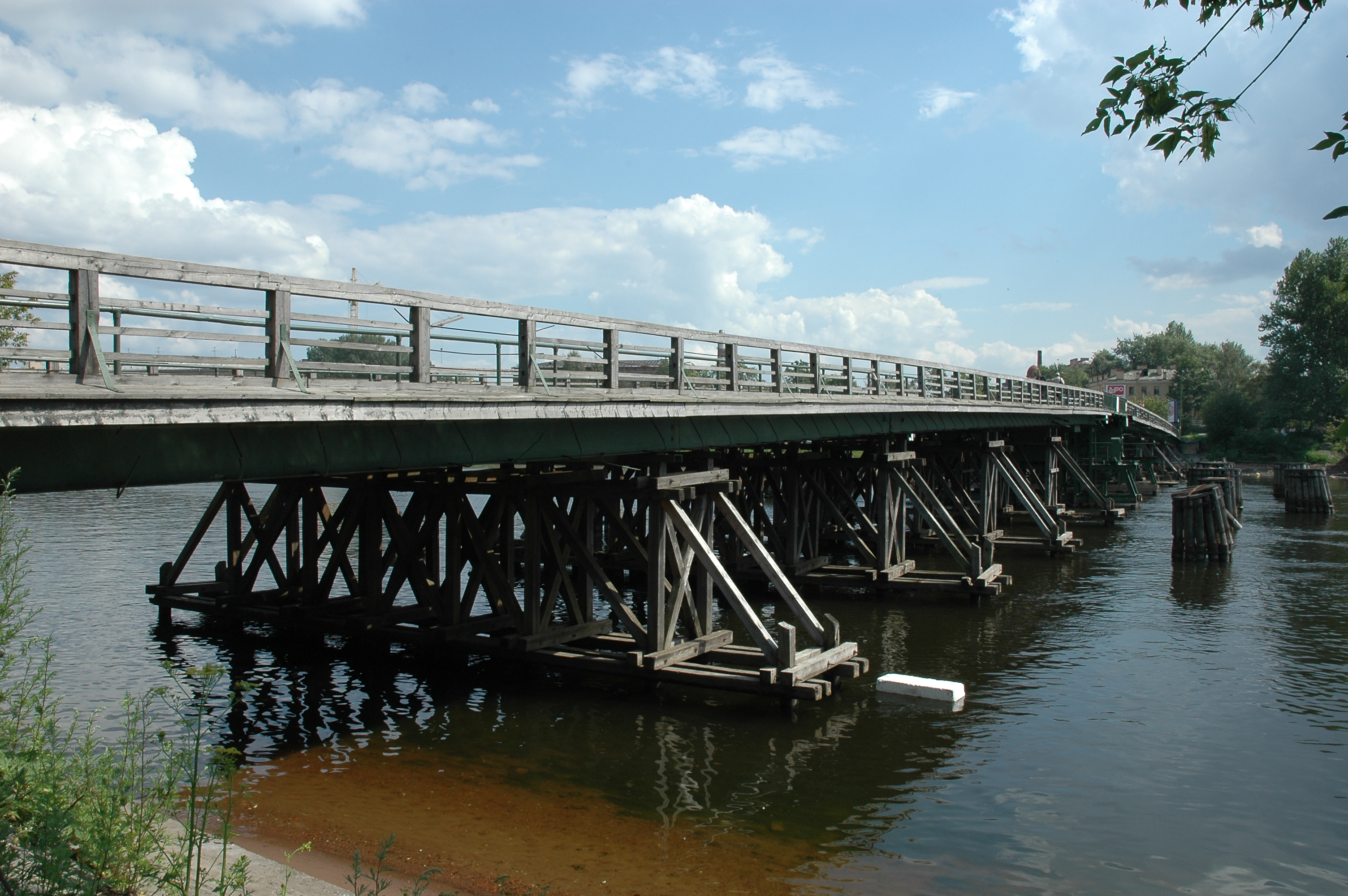
Lazarevsky bridge before 2008-2009 reconstruction

The bridge remained open to tram traffic until 2002. After the closure of the tram line, it was used as a pedestrian-only bridge.

In 2008-2009 the bridge was rebuilt from scratch, now as a single-span metal cable-stayed bridge, available for both car and pedestrian traffic. The new bridge has a length of 163 m and width of 22,5 m.

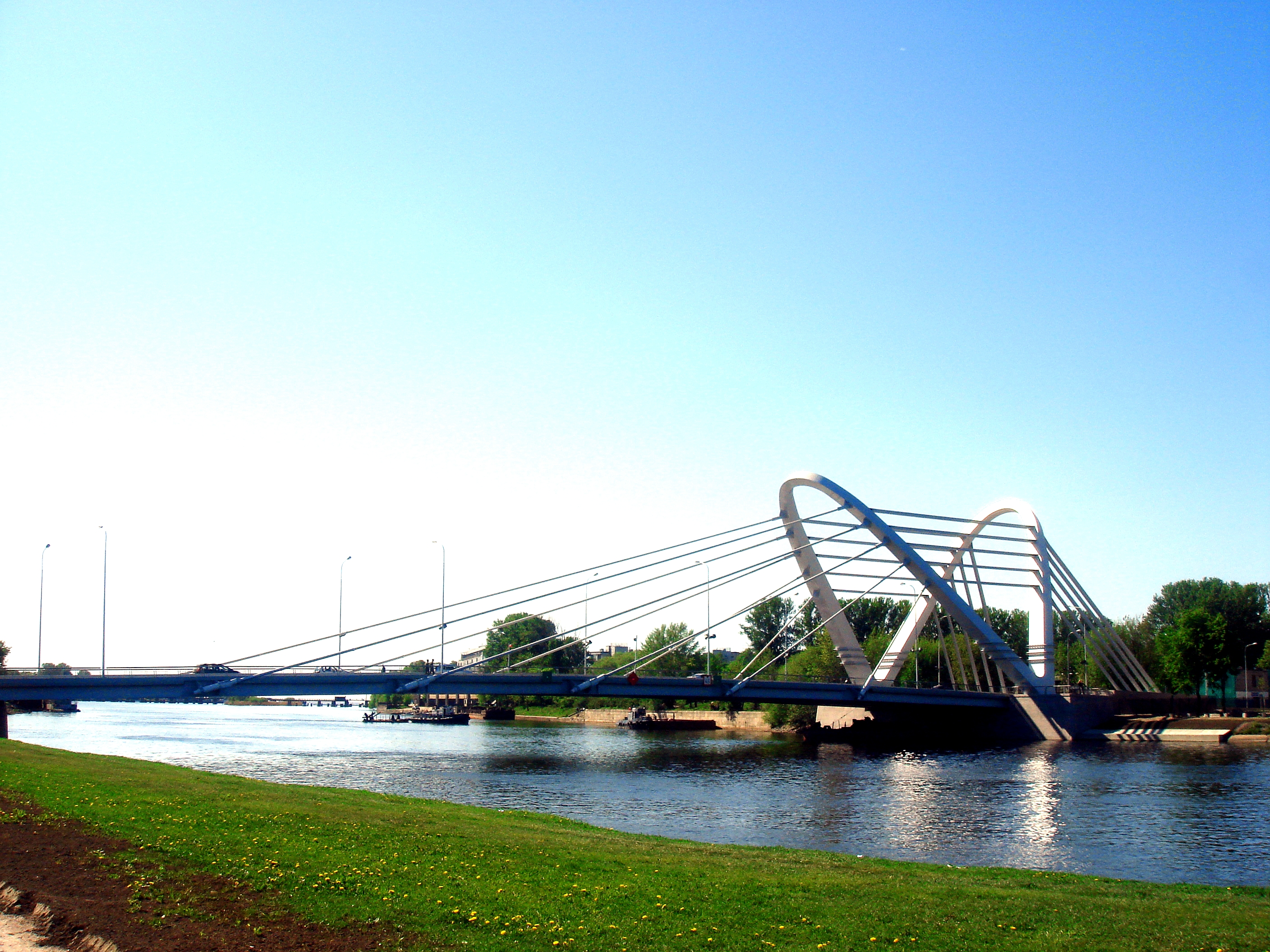
Lazarevsky bridge in 2009, after reconstruction

== See also ==
- List of bridges in Saint Petersburg
