= Aptekarsky Island =

Island in Russia

Аптекарский остров (Russian) Korpisaari (Finnish)
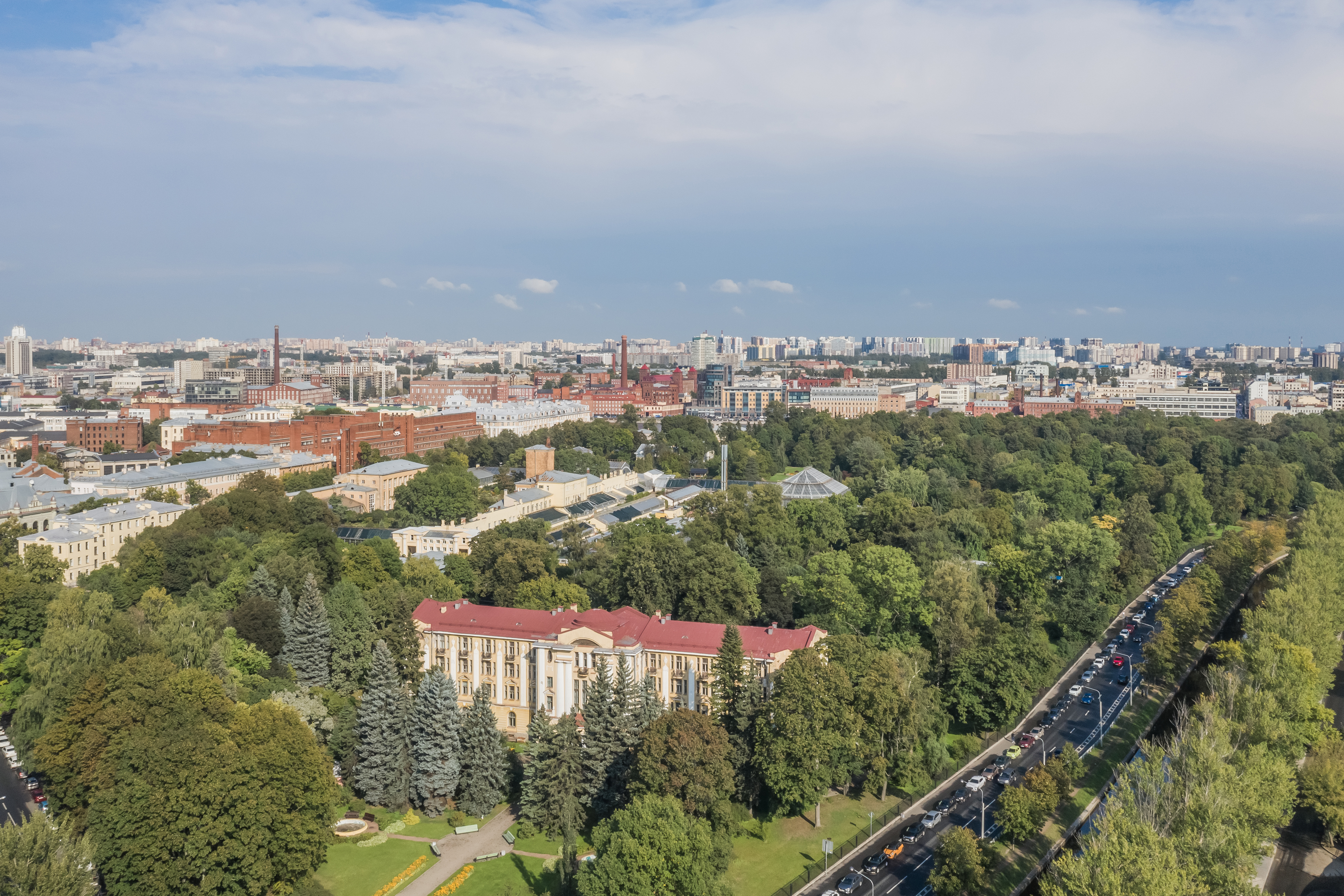
- Aerial view of the Botanical Garden

- Aptekarsky Island on the map of Saint Petersburg

Geography
- Coordinates: 59.97°N 30.31°E

Aptekarsky Island (Russian: Апте́карский о́стров, pronounced [ɐˈpʲtʲɛkərstkʲɪj ˈostrəf], "Apothecary Island", Finnish: Korpisaari, "Deep Forest Island") is a relatively small island situated in the northern part of the Neva delta. It is separated from Petrogradsky Island by the Karpovka River, from Kamenny Island and Krestovsky Island by the Malaya Nevka and from the Vyborgskaya region of St-Petersburg by the Bolshaya Nevka. It has an area of approximately two square kilometres.

Aptekarsky Island is connected to Petrogradsky Island by seven bridges: Aptekarsky Bridge, Petropavlovsky Bridge, Silyn Bridge, Geslerovsky Bridge, Karpovsky Bridge, Barochny Bridge and Molodyozhny Bridge. It is connected to Kamenny Island by Kamennoostrovsky Bridge and to the Vyborgskaya region by Kantemirovsky Bridge and Grenadersky Bridge.

In 1714, Tsar Peter I gave orders to transform the island into a headquarters for the Medical Clerical Office and the Main Pharmacy. The island's name, Aptekarsky, means pharmacy in Russian. On the southeastern part of the island, a garden was set up for the cultivation of medicinal herbs. Over time, it became the Saint Petersburg Botanical Garden and eventually, the Komarov Botanical Institute was founded here.

The island expanded from medicinal herbs into medical devices with the founding of the first medical device laboratory. This laboratory has since become the firm Krasnogvardeets, which is based in St. Petersburg.

During the reigns of Paul I and Alexander I of Russia, the area became a resort destination as Russian aristocrats came to the island and built their country estates.

As the industrialization of the island grew, the 20th century brought apartment construction to house the new workers. A number of the apartment houses were designed by such renowned Russian architects as Vladimir Shuko, designer of the Russian State Library in Moscow, and Fyodor Lidval, designer of the Hotel Astoria in St. Petersburg.

A number of significant structures still stand on the island today including the First Lensoveta House (designed by Yevgeniy Levinson and Ivan Fomin), several buildings for television broadcast center (designed by Sergei Speransky), the television tower and the Youth Palace.

Major educational institutions include the Saint Petersburg State Electrotechnical University, Saint-Petersburg State Chemical Pharmaceutical Academy and the Experimental Medicine Institute of the Russian Academy of Medical Science. The St. Petersburg Hydro Meteorological Center is also located on the island.
