= Kamenny Island Theatre =

Theatre on Kammeny Island, St. Petersburg, Russia

Coordinates: 59.976404°N 30.274673°E

The Bolshoi Drama Theatre, Second Stage
- Каменноостровский театр, вторая сцена БДТ
- Kamenny Island Theatre
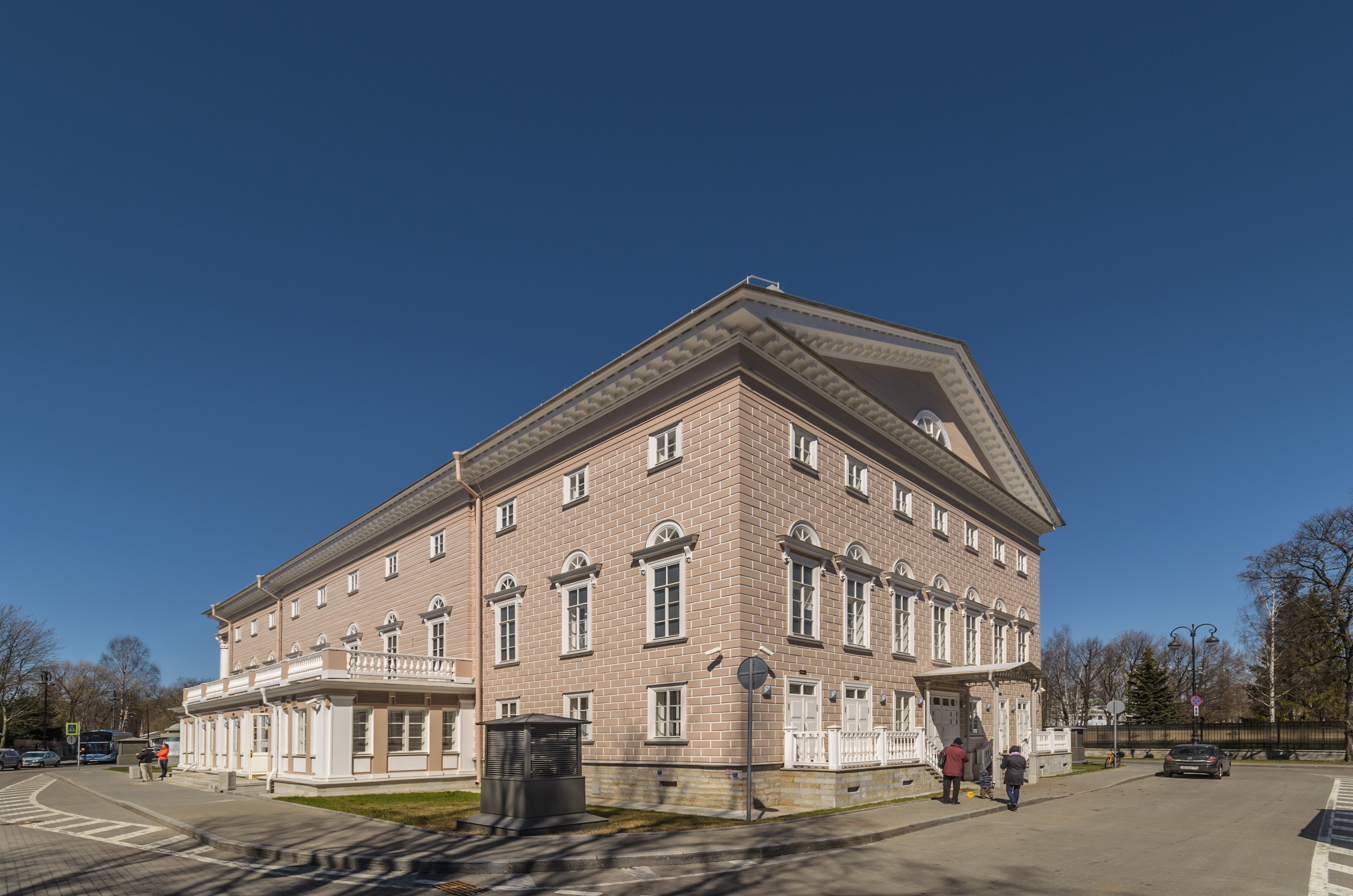
- Interactive map of The Bolshoi Drama Theatre, Second Stage
- Address: Old Theatre Sq. 13, St. Petersburg, Russia
- Operator: Tovstonogov Bolshoi Drama Theatre
- Capacity: 310

Construction
- Opened: 1826
- Renovated: 1843, 1964 - 1967, 2006 - 2012
- Architects: Smaragd Shustov, Alberto Cavos

The Kamenny Island Theatre (also known as the Stone Island Theatre, in Russian: Каменноостровский театр) is a wooden theatre on the grounds of the Kamennoostrovsky Palace, Kamenny Island, Saint Petersburg, Russia. It is the only surviving wooden theatre in St. Petersburg, and one of the few remaining in Europe. The theatre is a world heritage site protected by UNESCO.

Since 2005, the theatre is home to a second stage of the Bolshoi Drama.

== History of the building ==
The theatre was built in 1826 to a design by Smaragd Shustov in just 40 days. The building was intended to stand for seven years, but it survived much more. In 1843, Alberto Cavos was commissioned to develop a new project. Reconstruction of the theatre has principally changes the building's outlook, but the auditorium received only minor changes. In 1964–1967, the venue was restorated according to a project overseen by Irina Benois. Although the facade of the theatre was kept intact, the auditorium was completely rearranged. After the reconstruction, the theatre was made property of the St. Petersburg Television Company. In 2005, a decree of the President of Russia has transferred the Kamenny Island Theatre to the Bolshoi Drama Theatre. Extensive renovation took place in between 2005 and 2012, when the theatre has opened as the second stage of the Bolshoi Drama.
