= Kamennoostrovsky Bridge =

Bascule bridge in Saint Petersburg, Russia

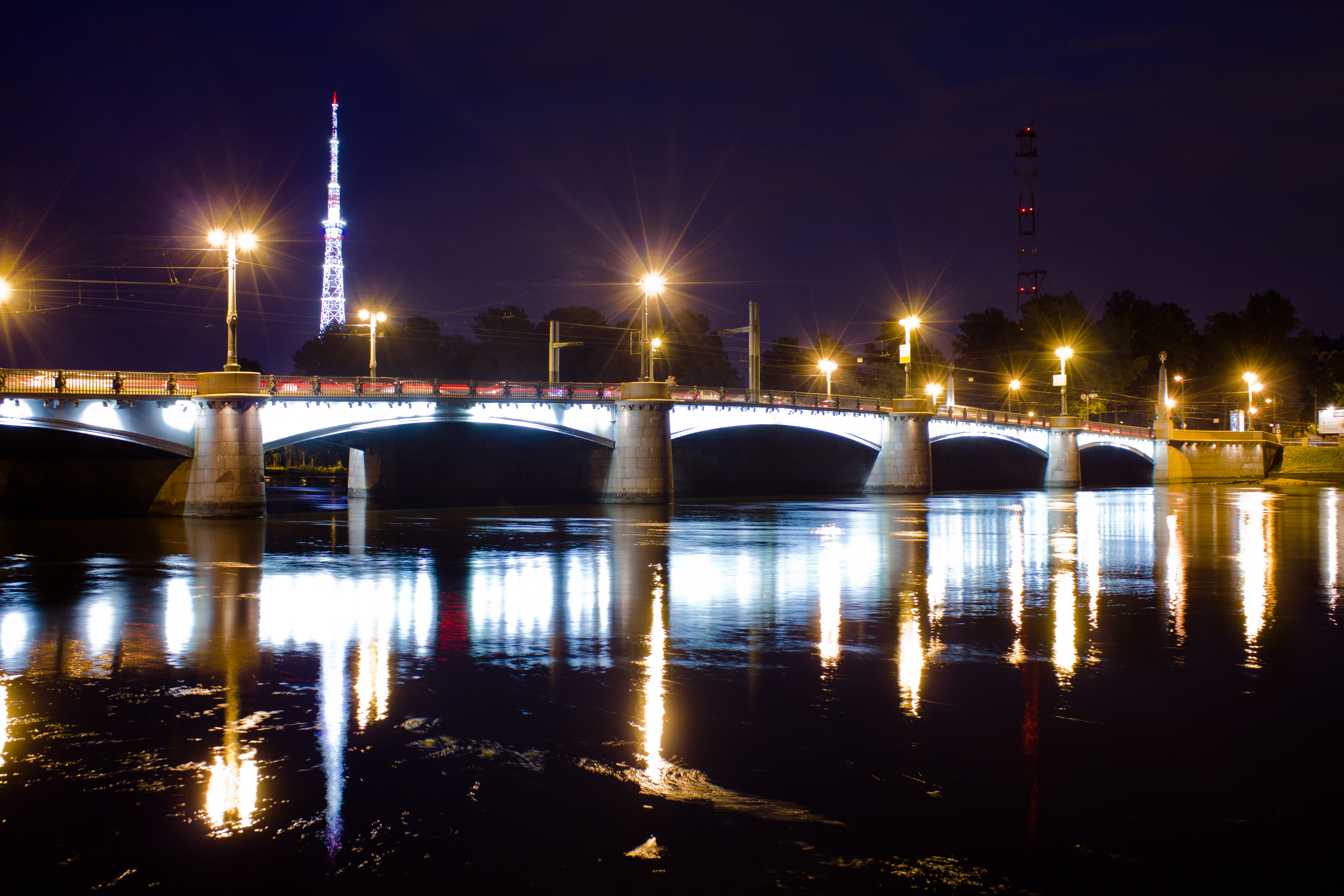
- Coordinates: 59.977544°N 30.301225°E
- Crosses: Little Nevka River
- Locale: Saint Petersburg
- Official name: Kamennoostrovsky Bridge

Characteristics
- Material: Metal

History
- Architect: P. A. Areshev; V. S. Vasilyev
- Engineering design by: V. V. Demchenko; B. B. Levin

Location
- Interactive map of Kamennoostrovsky Bridge

Kamennoostrovsky Bridge spans the Little Nevka River and connects Aptekarsky Island with Kamenny Island in Saint Petersburg, Russia. Originally constructed as a floating pontoon bridge in 1760. Between 1811 and 1813, Kamennoostrovsky Bridge became the first seven span timber arch bridge in Russia. In 1859, the bridge was improved with the addition of strut-supported spans. In 1952, the bridge was rebuilt to its current design with five spans.

== Original construction ==
The bridge was originally designed by architect Alexander Vist in 1760 to be a pontoon bridge consisting of 11 pontoon sections. In 1765, the pontoons were replaced with a floating bridge and was connected to the river abutments on piles.

== 19th century improvements ==
Between 1811 and 1813, Project Engineer Agustín de Betancourt replaced the floating bridge with a seven span wooden arch bridge on timber foundations with stone abutments. The total length of the bridge in this form was 150 metres (492.1 ft).

In 1859, Project Engineer Anton Shtukenberg conducted a complete reconstruction of the bridge. The arch design was replaced with a complex strut-frame system.

In 1899, during repair work, the bridge was completely rebuilt again. This reconstruction converted the bridge from a seven span to an eleven span simple timber bridge.

== 20th century improvements ==
In 1938, the bridge was renovated. Metal I-beams replaced the wooden girders, granite facing replaced old stone abutments, and the intermediate supports were renovated.

In 1953, under Project Engineers Vladimir Demchenko and B. B. Levin work began to improve the bridge again. Project architects P. A. Areshev and V. S. Vasilyev designed a new five span metal bridge including a central draw span to accommodate increased traffic and load weights. The draw span was a twin-leaf rolling bascule system with fixed counterweights and was powered by an electromechanical drive. Currently, the span is no longer functional.

== See also ==
- List of bridges in Saint Petersburg
