= Maritime Victory Park =

Coordinates: 59°58′18.70″N 30°14′30.33″E

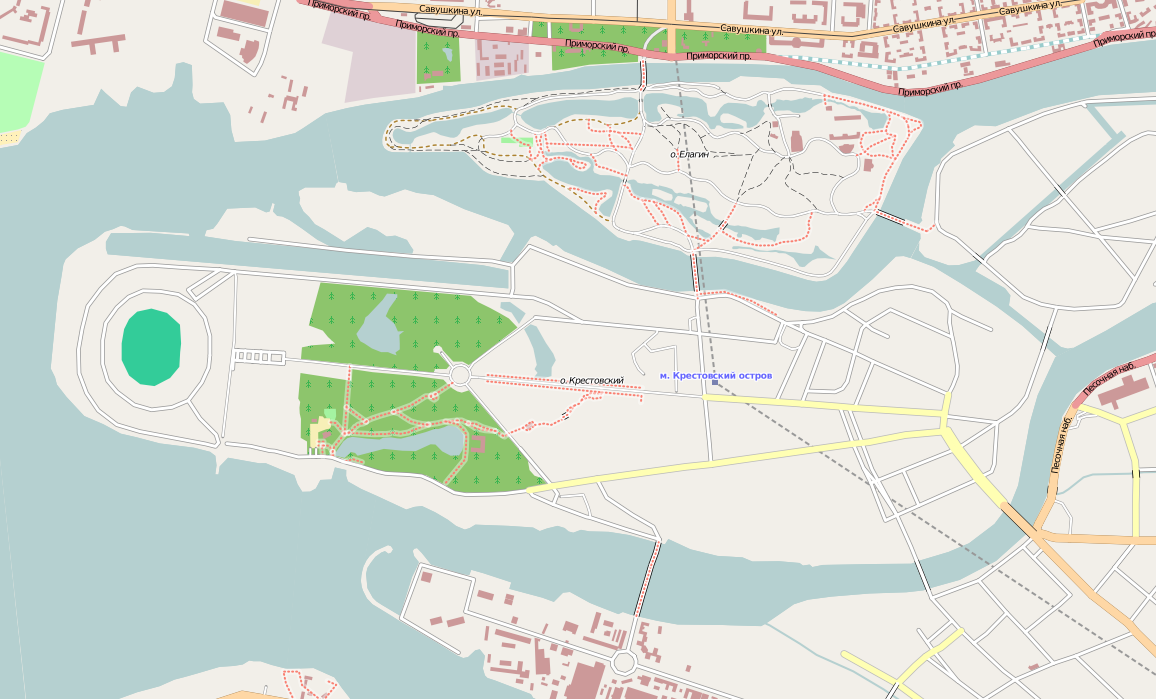
Maritime Victory Park

Maritime Victory Park (Russian: Приморский парк Победы) is a municipal park on Krestovsky Island in Saint Petersburg, Russia. It was opened in 1945 to commemorate the Allied victory over Nazi Germany in World War II. Today, it covers 243 hectares of recreational, scenic, and natural areas, and is the location of Krestovsky Stadium.

== Notable features ==
The park is a popular destination for St. Petersburg residents and tourists, featuring

- beautiful landscaping and formal gardens
- bronze sculptures Black Sea Sailor and Girl Greeting the Victors.
- the Avenue of Friendship of Cities, where delegates from various countries around the world have planted trees and flowers since 1966.

In addition to the war memorial, the park housed the former Kirov Stadium, one of the largest multi-use stadiums in the world. Its successor Krestovsky Stadium was inaugurated in 2017.

== See also ==
- Kirov Stadium
- Krestovsky Island
