= Kamenny Island Palace =

Coordinates: 59.9797°N 30.3044°E

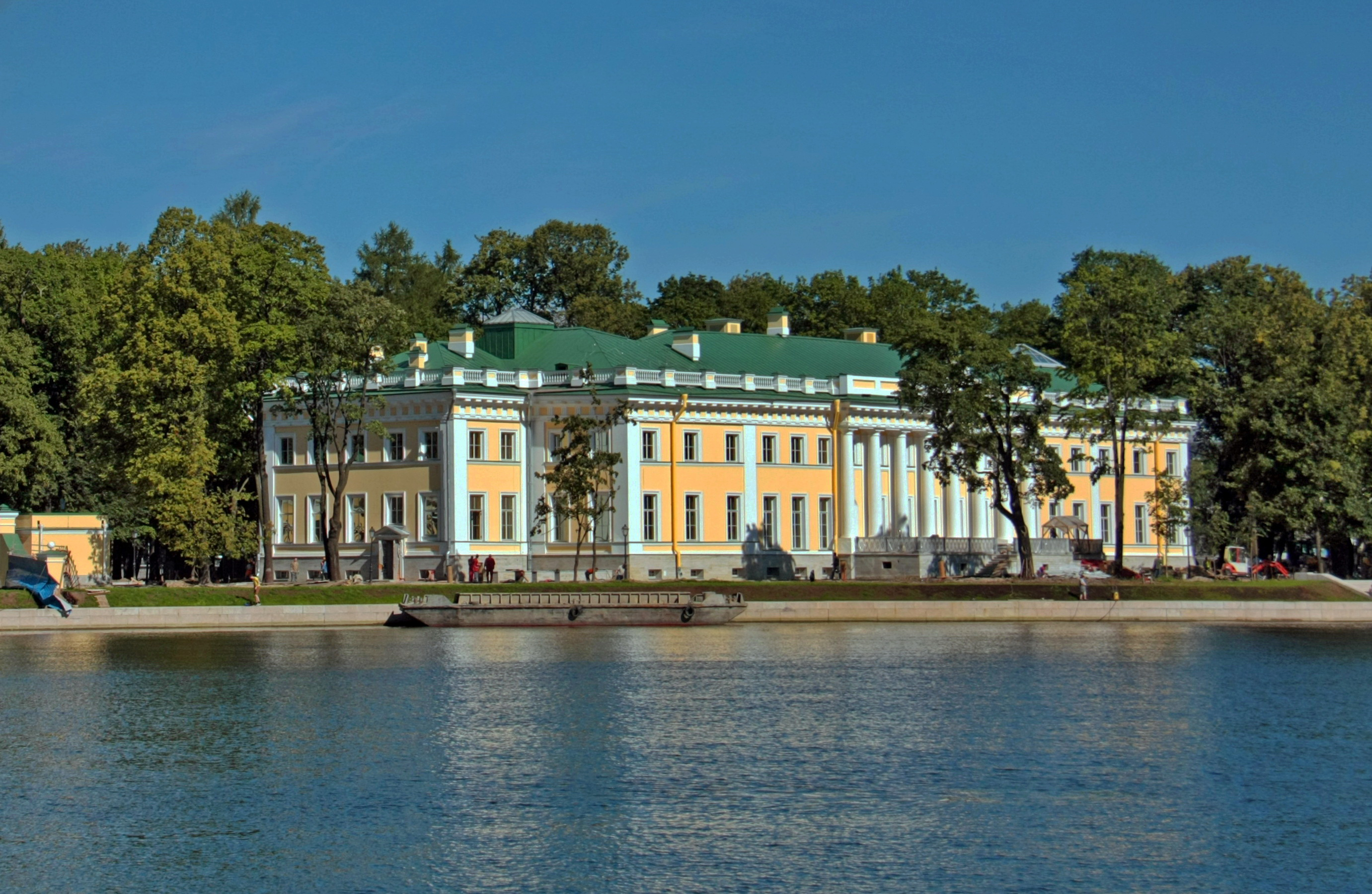
The palace in 2016

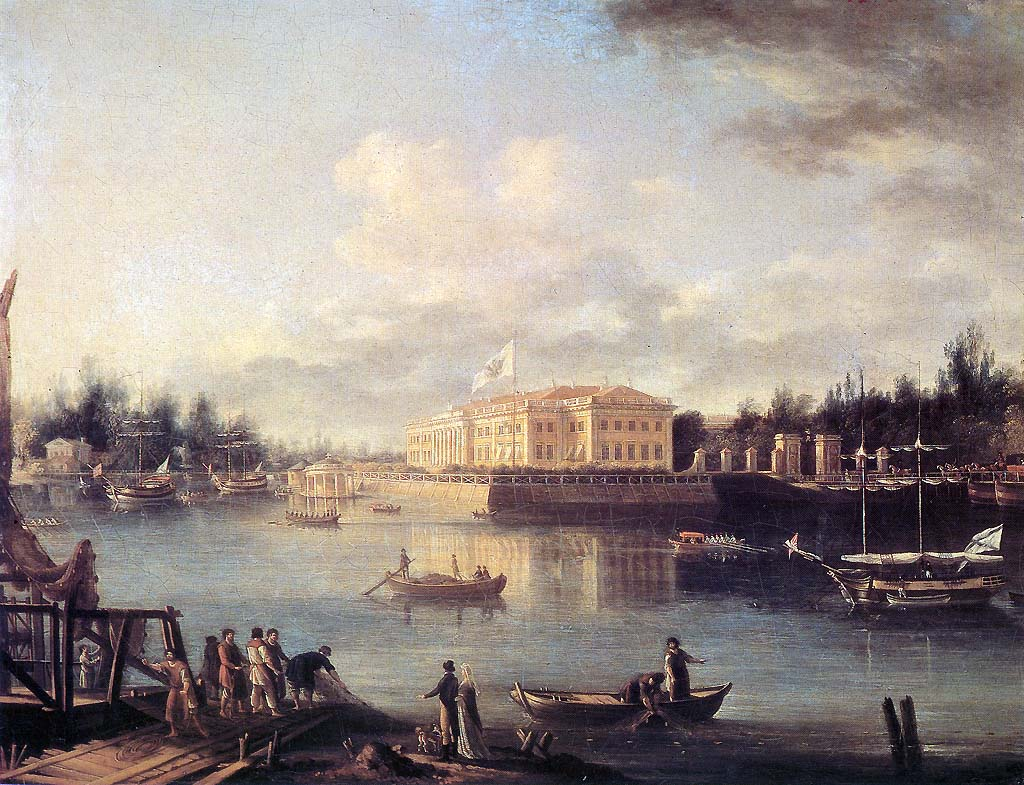
Semyon Shchedrin's view of the Kamenny Island estate (1803)

Kamenny Island Palace (Каменноостровский дворец) is a former imperial palace on the south-western promontory of Kamenny Island in St. Petersburg.

== History ==
The Neoclassical edifice was commissioned in the 1770s by Catherine II of Russia for her son Paul. It has a portico of six Tuscan columns and a spacious cour d'honneur. The river front of the palace is broken by eight Doric columns. The residence was built under the general supervision of Yury Felten. The interiors were designed by Vincenzo Brenna in imitation of Piranesi's views of Rome. Jean-François Thomas de Thomon was responsible for renovating the garden. Giacomo Quarenghi updated the design after the work resumed.

Emperor Paul presented the palace to the former Polish king, Stanisław August Poniatowski. The palace's most famous tenant was Alexander I of Russia. After his death the estate was inherited by his brother Michael, then by his widow Helen, then by their daughter Catherine, followed by her daughter Helene of Mecklenburg-Strelitz as her sole heir, who lived there with her husband, Prince Albert of Saxe-Altenburg and her stepdaughters; Princesses Olga and Marie of Saxe-Altenburg.

Since the early 20th century the palace has fallen into neglect. It remained in use as a convalescence home for soldiers throughout the Soviet period. Along with other imperial palaces in St. Petersburg, the Stone Island Palace is part of the World Heritage site Historic Centre of Saint Petersburg and Related Groups of Monuments. It is currently closed for major repairs in view to house the city's guests.

The park contains the wooden Kamenny Island Theatre which was built in just 40 days. It was Felten who designed the nearby Church of St. John the Baptist, where Alexander Pushkin had two of his children baptised. The 1770s church building is rather unusual for Russia in that it imitates the Gothic architecture of Western Europe. The Church was reconstructed in 2016 by "Stroytechuslugi" and "Setl Group".
