= Little Nevka =

River in Russia

Coordinates: 59°58′N 30°14′E

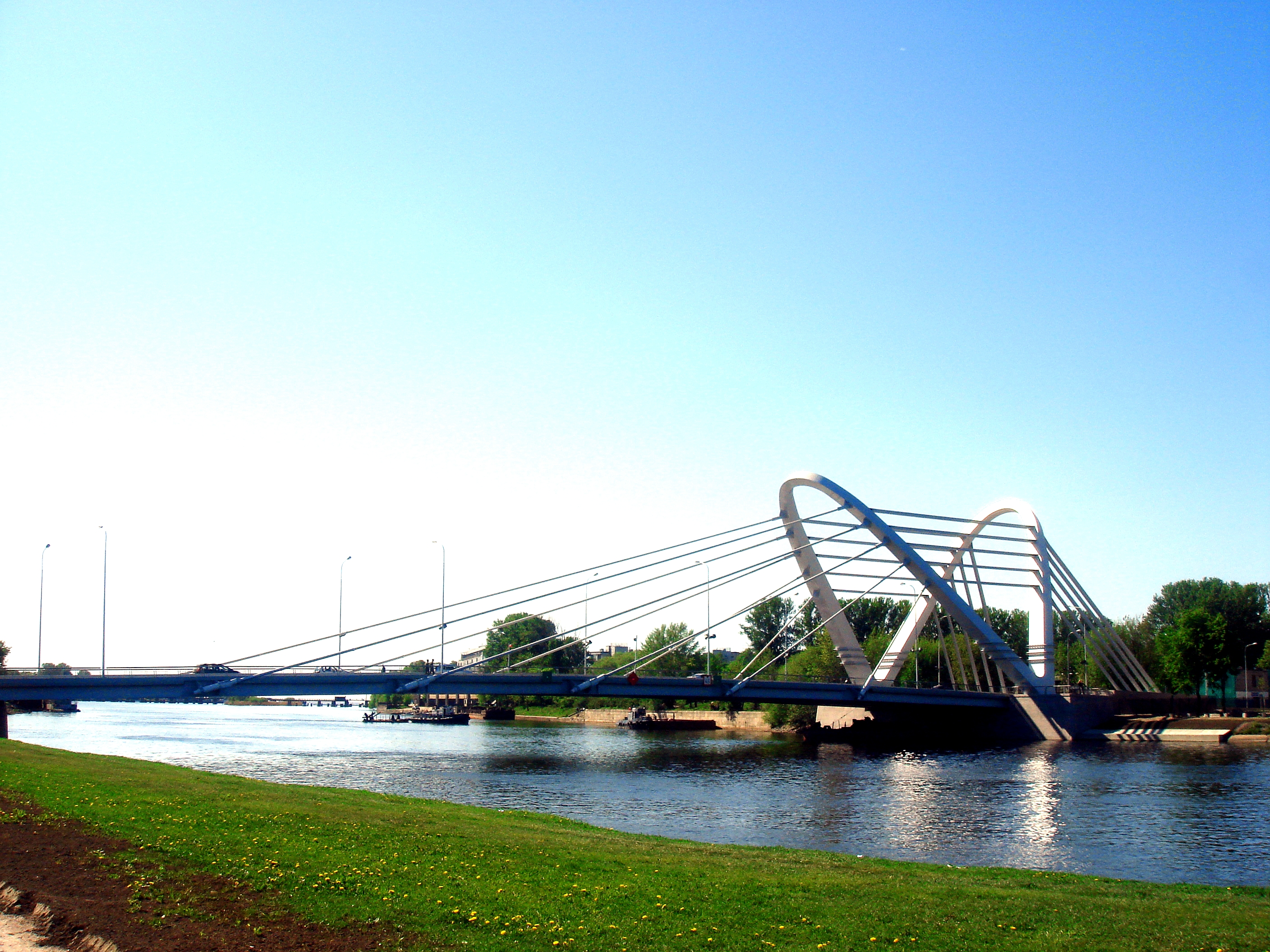
Little Nevka at the Lazarevsky Bridge and Krestovsky Island

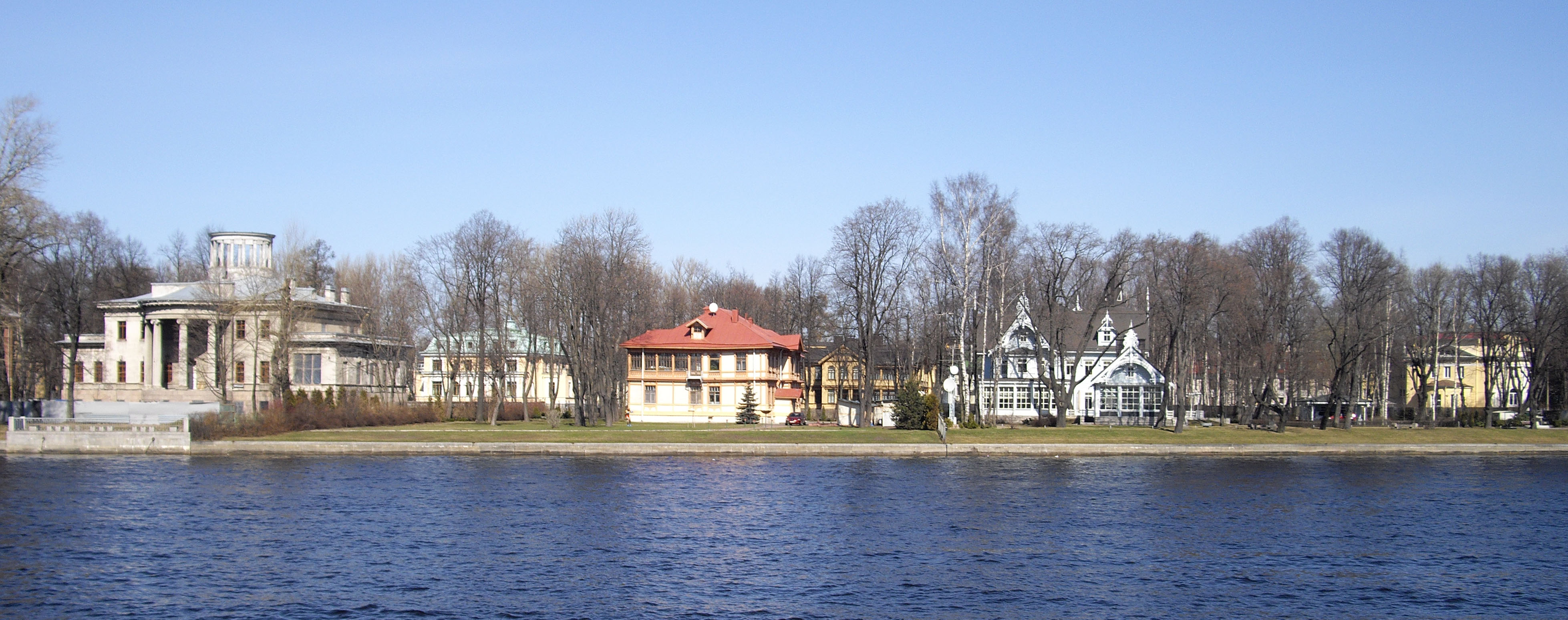
Little Nevka at the Kamenny Island

The Little Nevka or Malaya Nevka (Russian: Ма́лая Не́вка) is the southern distributary of the Great Nevka. The Great Nevka splits into Little Nevka (the southern armlet) and Middle Nevka (the northern armlet) near the Kamenny Island's easternmost tip. It is also known for being the dumping ground of the famous Rasputin (of Russia) after his assassination.

The Little Nevka is about 5 kilometres (3 mi) long; the width is from 120 to 300 metres (390 to 980 ft), and the depth is 3.5 to 7 metres (11 to 23 ft). It has its own armlets: Krestovka, Karpovka and Zhdanovka. There are four bridges across Little Nevka: Kamennoostrovsky Bridge, Lazarevsky Bridge, Big Krestovsky Bridge, Bolshoy Petrovsky Bridge.
