= Middle Nevka =

River in Russia

Coordinates: 59°59′N 30°14′E

The Middle Nevka or Srednyaya Nevka (Russian: Сре́дняя Не́вка) is a branch of the Neva river delta in St. Petersburg, Russia. Flowing between Yelagin, Kamenny and Krestovsky islands, it empties into the Neva Bay.
