= Saint Petersburg Botanical Garden =

Oldest botanical garden in Russia

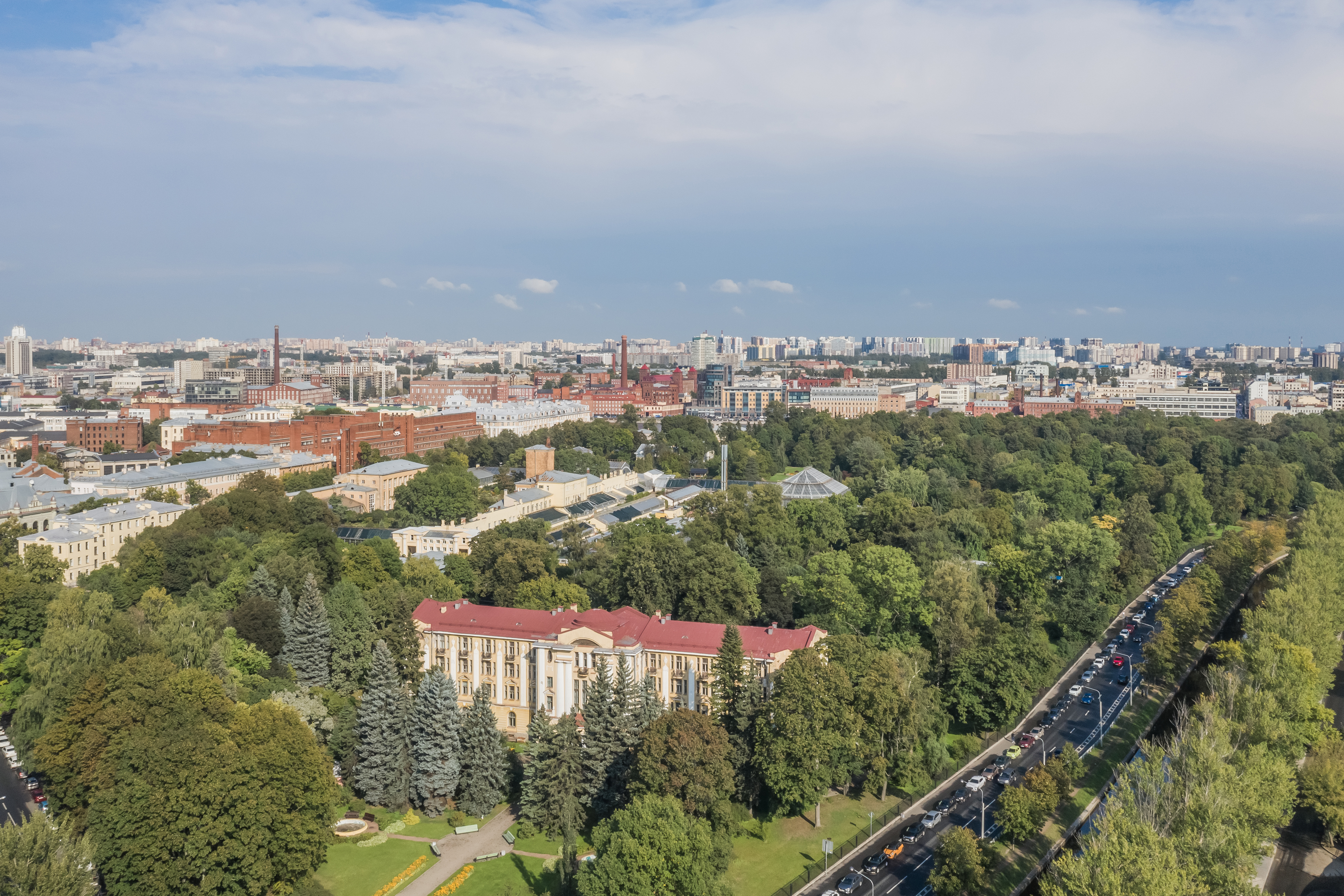
- Aerial view
- Type: Botanical garden
- Location: Saint Petersburg, Russia
- Coordinates: 59.97°N 30.324°E
- Area: 18.9 hectares (47 acres)
- Opened: 1714

The main Saint Petersburg Botanical Garden, officially known as the Russian Academy of Sciences Vladimir Komarov Botanical Institute's Botanical Garden of Peter the Great (Russian: Ботанический сад Петра Великого Ботанического института им. В. Л. Комарова РАН (in short Ботанический сад БИН РАН); since 1823 Emperor's Botanical Garden "Императорский Ботанический сад", originally Apothecary Garden "Аптекарский огород"), is the second oldest botanical garden in Russia. It consists of outdoor and indoor collections situated on Aptekarsky Island in Saint Petersburg and belongs to the Komarov Botanical Institute of the Russian Academy of Sciences. It is 18.9 ha in area, and is bordered by Aptekarsky Prospekt (main entrance), Prof. Popov Street (second entrance), as well as the embankments of the Karpovka and Bolshaya Neva rivers.

== Overview ==
The garden, located in Ulitsa Professora Popova, St. Petersburg, Russia, was founded by Peter I in 1714 as a herb garden in order to grow medicinal plants and re-established as a botanical institution under the name Imperial Botanical Garden in 1823, with assistance from John Goldie. Ivan Lepyokhin was in charge of the botanical garden from 1774 until 1802. Beginning in 1855, Eduard August von Regel was associated with the garden, first as Scientific Director and then as Director General (1875–1892). Regel had a particular fascination with the genus Allium, overseeing collections of these plants in the Russian Far East and writing about them in two monographs. More than 60 of the alliums he identified bear his name, e.g., A. giganteum Regel and A. rosenbahianum Regel. Many alliums can be viewed in the Northern Yard of the garden. In 1897 Constantin Georg Alexander Winkler became head botanist at the garden. He then reorganized the herbaria and greenhouse collections. Around 1900, Boris Fedtschenko became head botanist and he organised investigations of various Russian regions including Siberia, Caucusus, Middle Asia and Asiatic Russia. All published in various volumes and books.

In 1930, the garden became subordinate to the Academy of Sciences of the Soviet Union and, in 1931, was merged with the Botanical Museum into the Botanical Institute.

=== Greenhouses ===
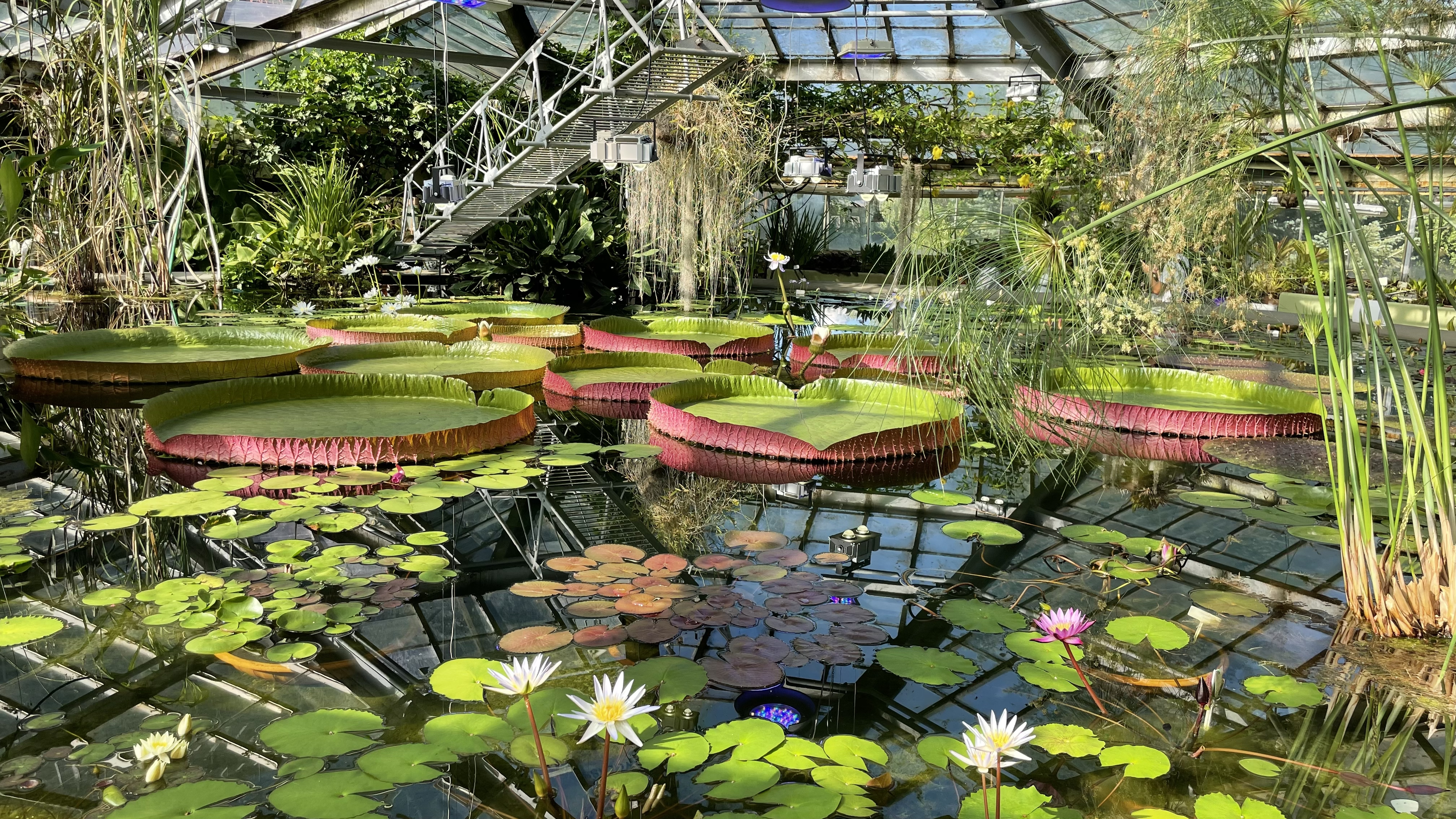
Greenhouse No. 28 (featuring Victoria amazonica) dates from the 19th century

The garden has 25 greenhouses constructed in 1823–1824. They are numbered from 1 to 28 (No. 5 and No. 25 don't exist; No. 10 and No. 11 are shared). Some of them are open to the public (guided visits only), including the large collections of azaleas and other Ericaceae (No. 6), ferns (No. 15), cacti and other succulents (No. 16), various tropical plants (No. 18), the 23.5 m high Big Palm Greenhouse with an important collection of orchids (No. 26) and the greenhouse with a pond containing Victoria amazonica (no. 28). The night blossom of cactus Selenicereus grandiflorus, cultivated there since 1857, is a celebrated event announced in mass media and open to the public in the 16th greenhouse in June-July. The indoor collections suffered significant losses during the Siege of Leningrad in 1941-1944; out of 6367 species only 861 survived.

The chain of greenhouses encircles the Southern Yard and the Northern Yard, the latter featuring an extensive outdoor collection of Iridaceae and bulbous plants, including many species of Allium. The building of the botanical museum faces the Northern Yard in place of the non-existent greenhouse No. 5.

=== Park ===
The outer park includes a small rock garden (constructed in the end of the 19th century) located in front of the Big Palm Greenhouse, and a 0.16 km² arboretum, organized partly as an English garden and partly as a formal garden. The park, unlike the greenhouses, is closed for visitors from October 1 to May 8. It is elevated only 1.5-3 m above sea-level and has thus regularly suffered from catastrophic floods characteristic of Saint Petersburg. The herbarium edifice built in 1913 stands in front of the main entrance.

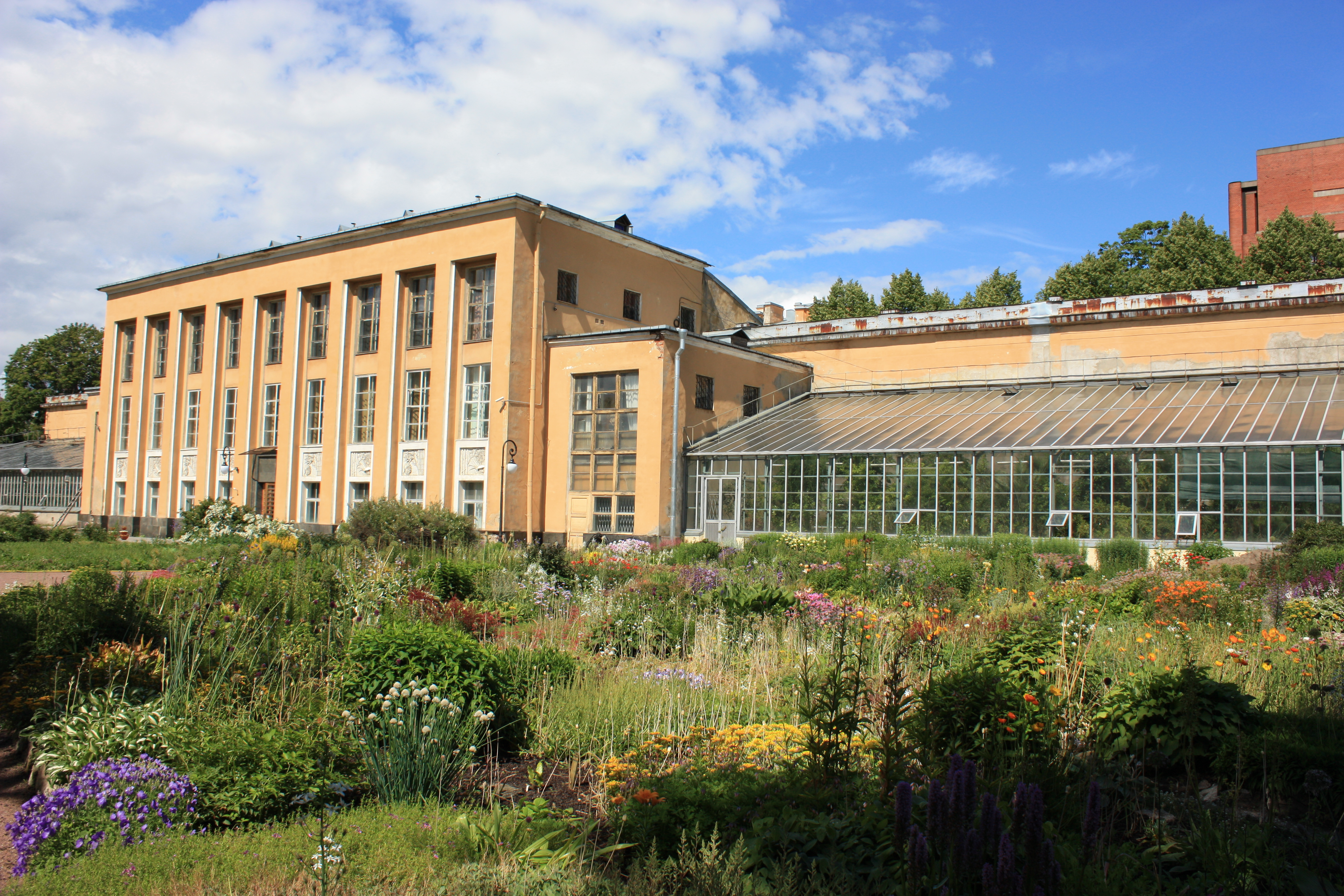
Northern Yard, Saint Petersburg Botanical Garden with greenhouses and Allium garden

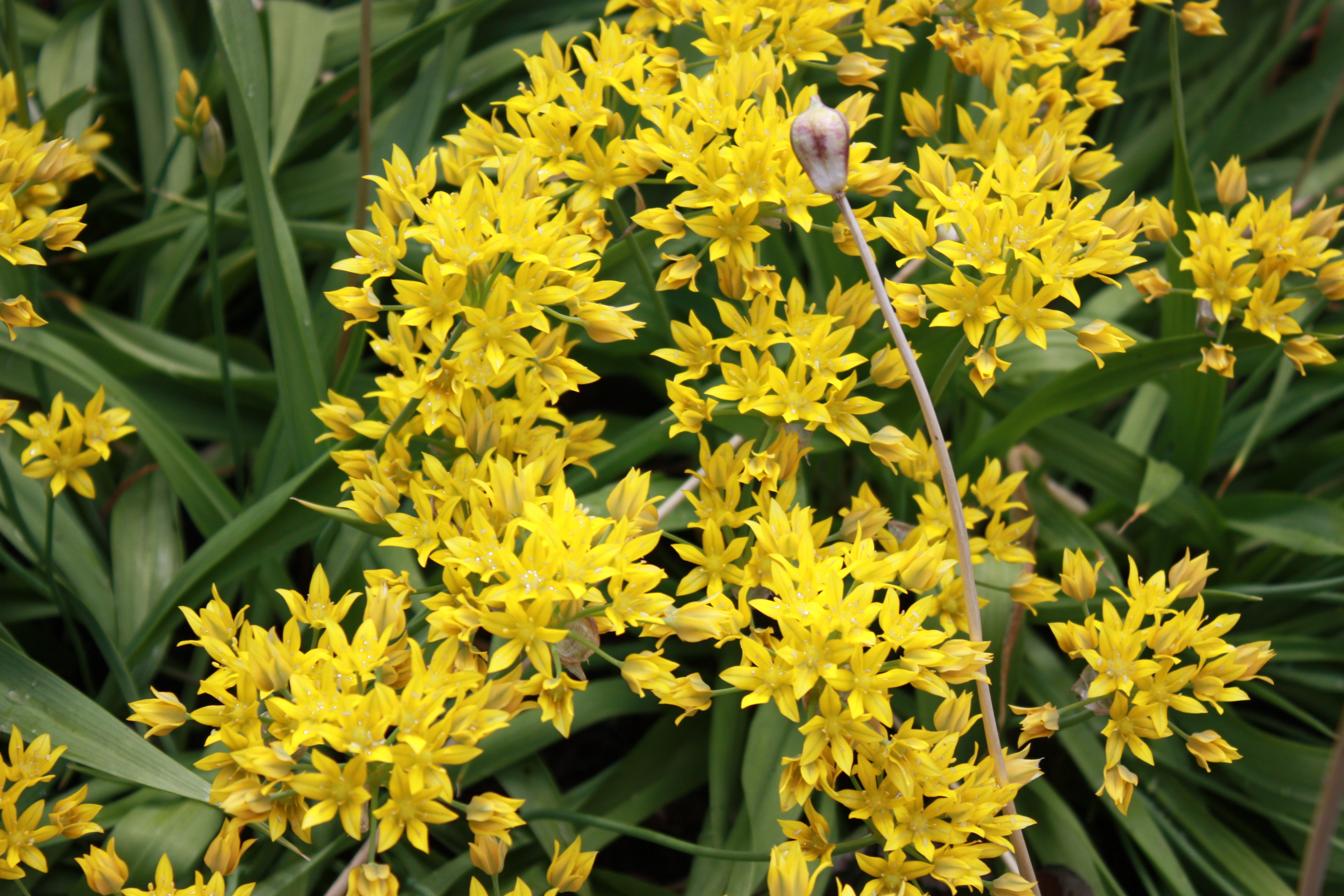
Allium moly in the Northern Yard, Saint Petersburg Botanical Garden

Bust of Eduard Regel in botanical museum, Saint Petersburg Botanical Garden

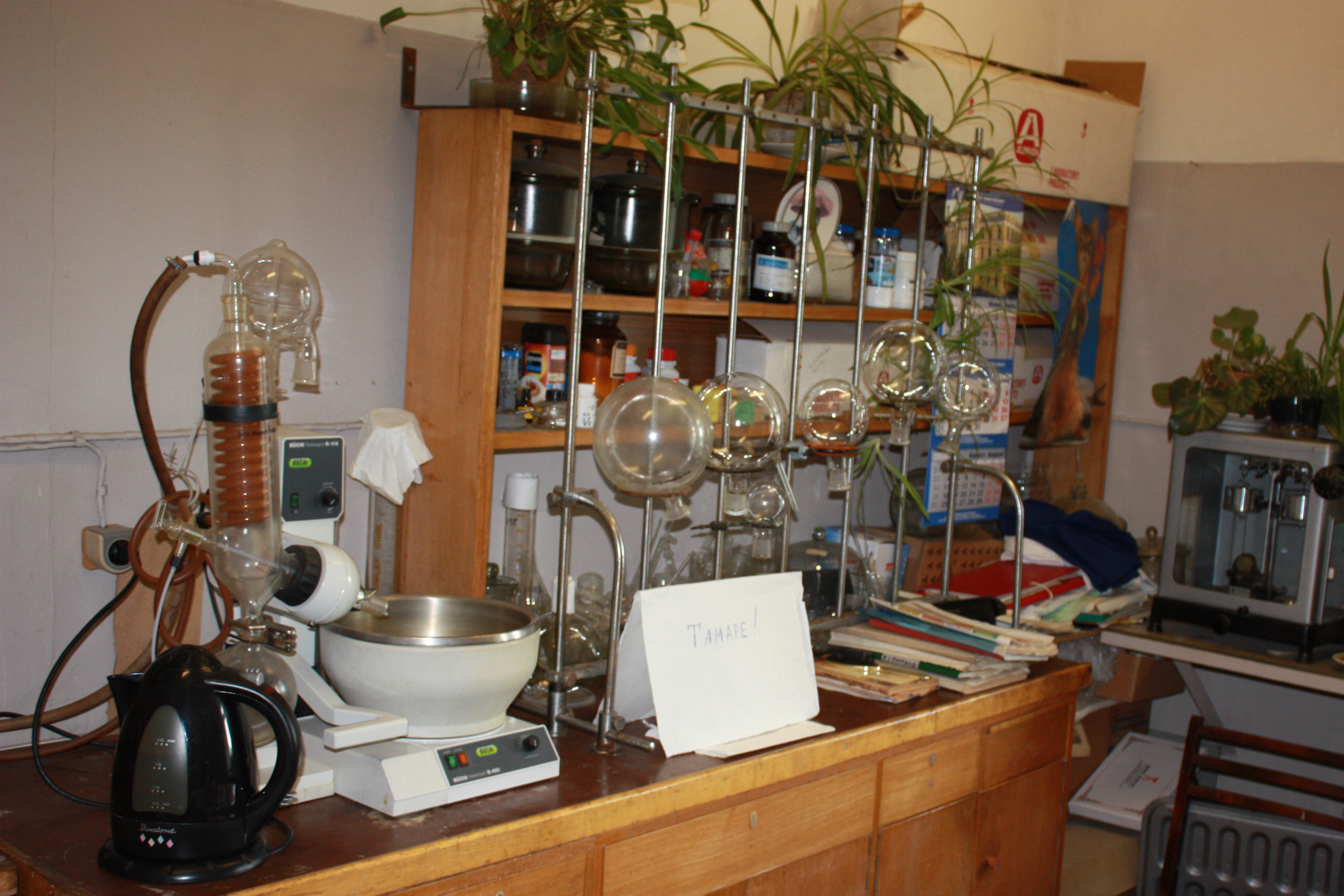
Botanical research laboratory, Saint Petersburg Botanical Garden

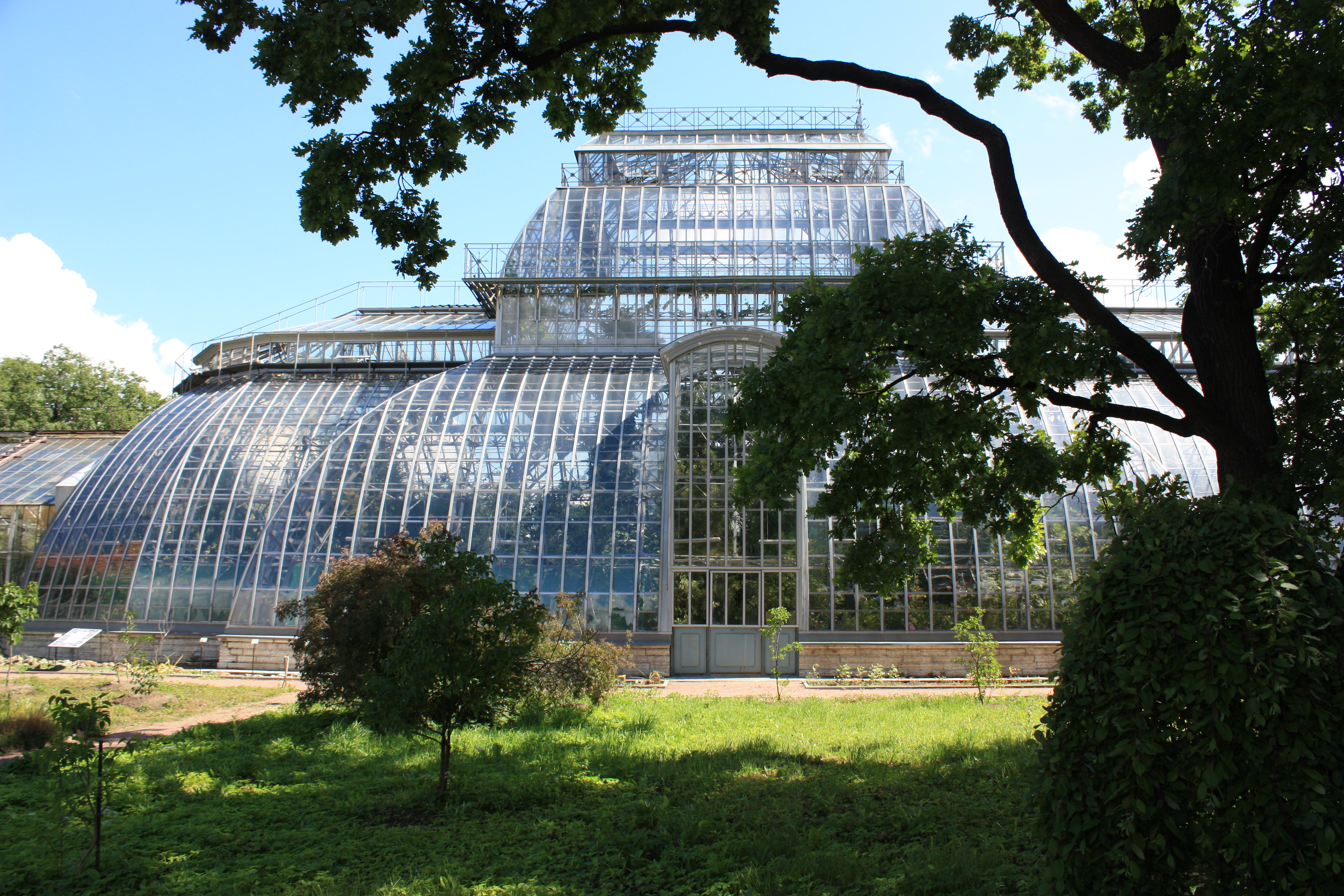
Palm Greenhouse, St. Petersburg Botanical Garden

== Sources ==
- Путеводитель по оранжереям Ботанического сада. Тропики. / Отв. ред. Н.А. Аврорин и Н. Н. Имханицкая. – Leningrad: Nauka, 1978.
- Ботанический сад. Leningrad: Lenizdat, 1989.
- Соколов В.С., А.А. Федорова. Ботанический институт имени В. Л. Комарова Академии наук СССР. Leningrad, 1947.
- От аптекарского огорода до Ботанического института. Leningrad: Изд-во АН СССР, 1957.
- BGCI: Arboretum of Komarov Botanical Institute in Saint Petersburg, Russia
