= Karpovka =

River in Russia

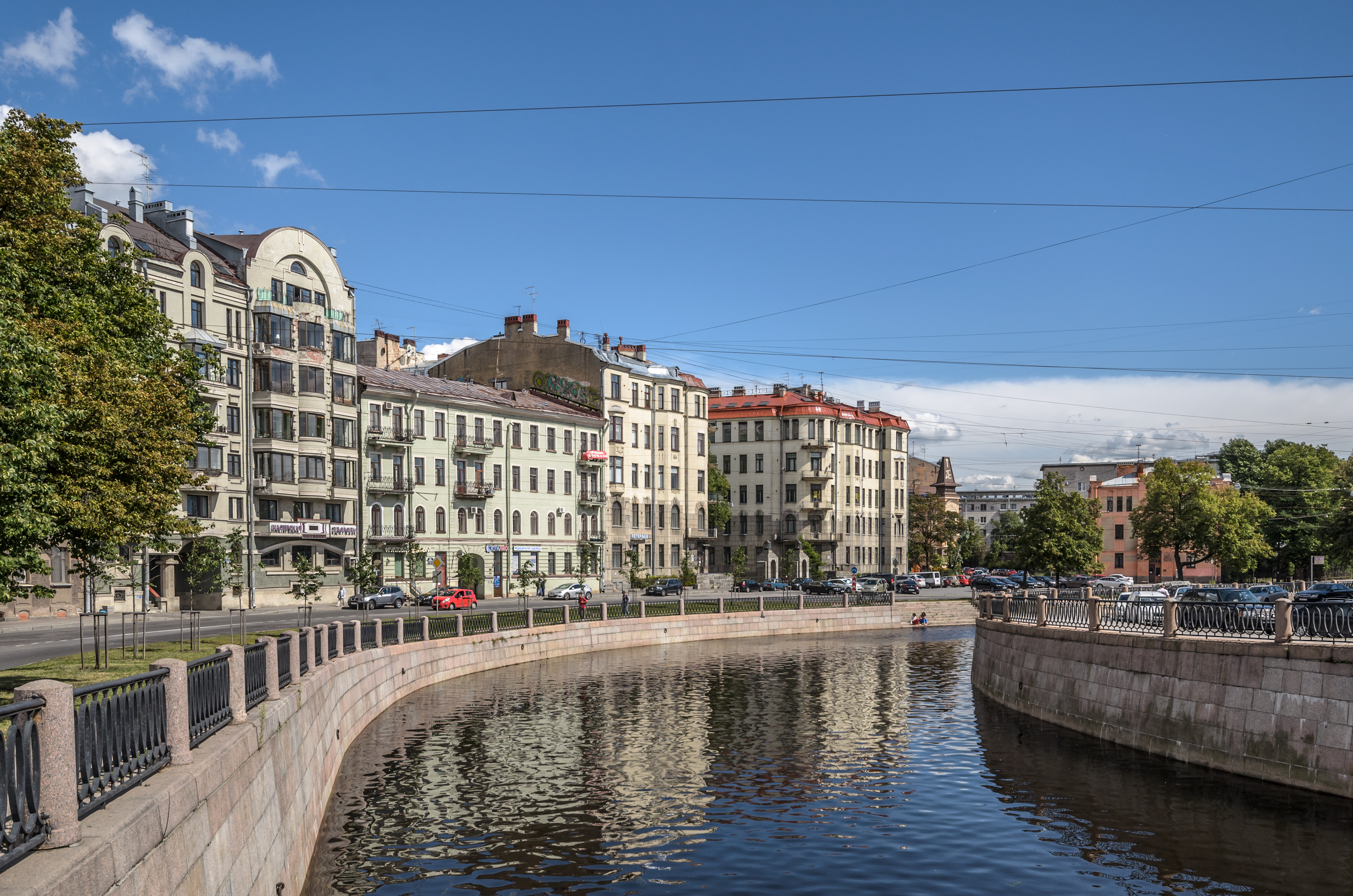
- The Karpovka as seen from Silin Bridge eastwards

Location
- Country: Russia

Physical characteristics
- Source
  - location: Bolshaya Nevka (59°58′03″N 30°19′58″E)
- Mouth
  - location: Malaya Nevka (59°58′05″N 30°16′57″E)
- Length: 3 km (1.9 mi)

The Karpovka (Russian: Ка́рповка) is a small river of the Neva basin in Saint Petersburg, Russia. It separates Aptekarsky Island (right bank) from Petrogradsky Island (left bank). The Karpovka flows from the Bolshaya Nevka to the Malaya Nevka and is 3 kilometres (2 mi) long. The Russian name is derived from the old Finnish name of the river, Korpijoki, meaning forested area river. The Saint Petersburg Botanical Garden and Ioannovsky Convent are situated on the right bank of the river.

== See also ==
- List of bridges in Saint Petersburg
