= Bolshoy Petrovsky Bridge =

Bridge in Saint Petersburg, Russia

Coordinates: 59.9648°N 30.2548°E

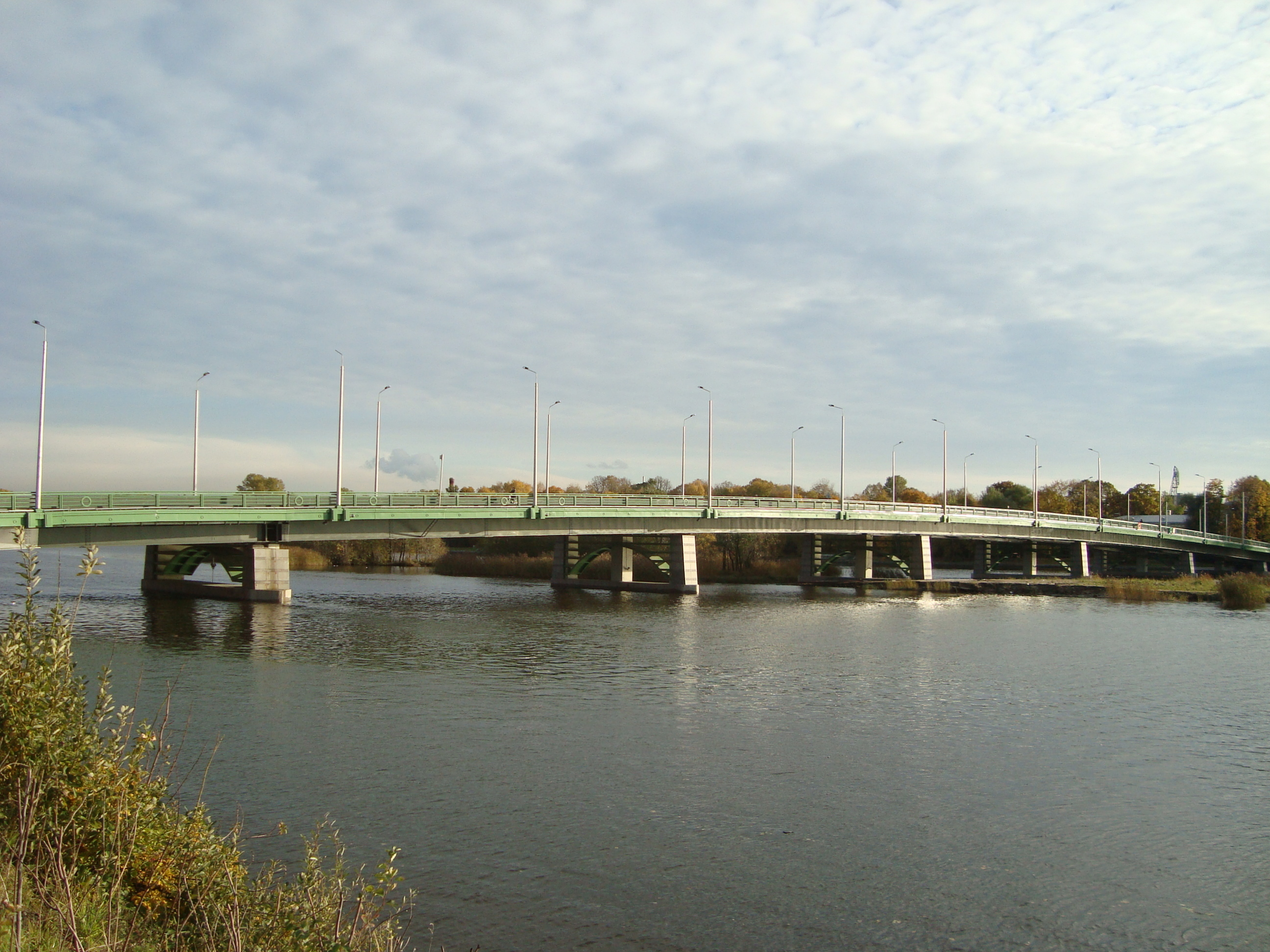
The new bridge (since 2010), pictured in 2011

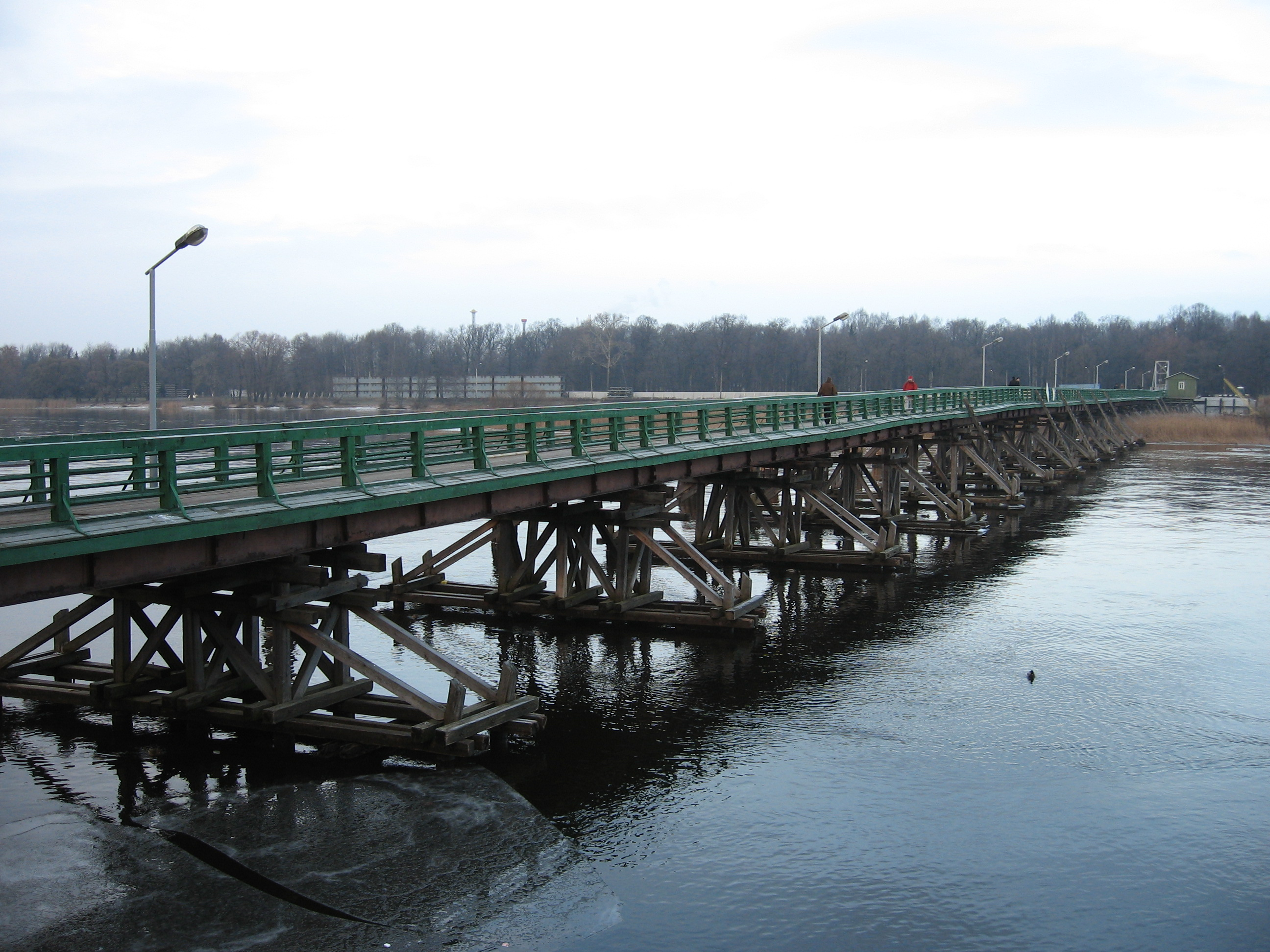
The old bridge (since 1838), pictured in 2007.

The Great or Bolshoi Petrovsky bridge is a bridge across Little Nevka in St. Petersburg, Russia, connecting Petrovsky Island with Krestovsky Island and passing over a small nameless islet on Little Nevka. It is very near the mouth of the river, which flows into the Finnish Gulf.

A wooden draw bridge was built in 1838. In 1916 the bridge was accommodated to two-way vehicular traffic. In 1947 the bridge was upgraded, with the spans replaced by metal beams; it then measured 297 metres (974 ft) long and 18 metres (59 ft) wide. In December 1993, ice destroyed part of the bridge structure. After that, the bridge was closed to vehicular traffic; it was narrowed to 2.2 metres (7.2 ft) and was used only by pedestrians. The construction of a new bridge was started in 2009, and this opened in 2010. In the latter year, the old wooden bridge was dismantled.

== Grigori Rasputin ==
On 29 December 1916 two passing workmen saw blood stains on the 4th bridge span. There was more blood on the bridge panels, railing and bridge supports. When a galosh was spotted lying between two adjacent foundations the matter became very serious [for the police].

On 1 January 1917, Grigori Rasputin's body was found near the bridge.

== See also ==
- List of bridges in Saint Petersburg

== Sources ==
- Nelipa, Margarita (2010). The Murder of Grigorii Rasputin: A Conspiracy That Brought Down the Russian Empire. Bowmanville, ON: Gilbert's Books. pp. 252–253. ISBN 978-0-9865310-1-9
