= Kirov Stadium =

Stadium in St, Petersburg, Russia

Coordinates: 59°58′23″N 30°13′14″E

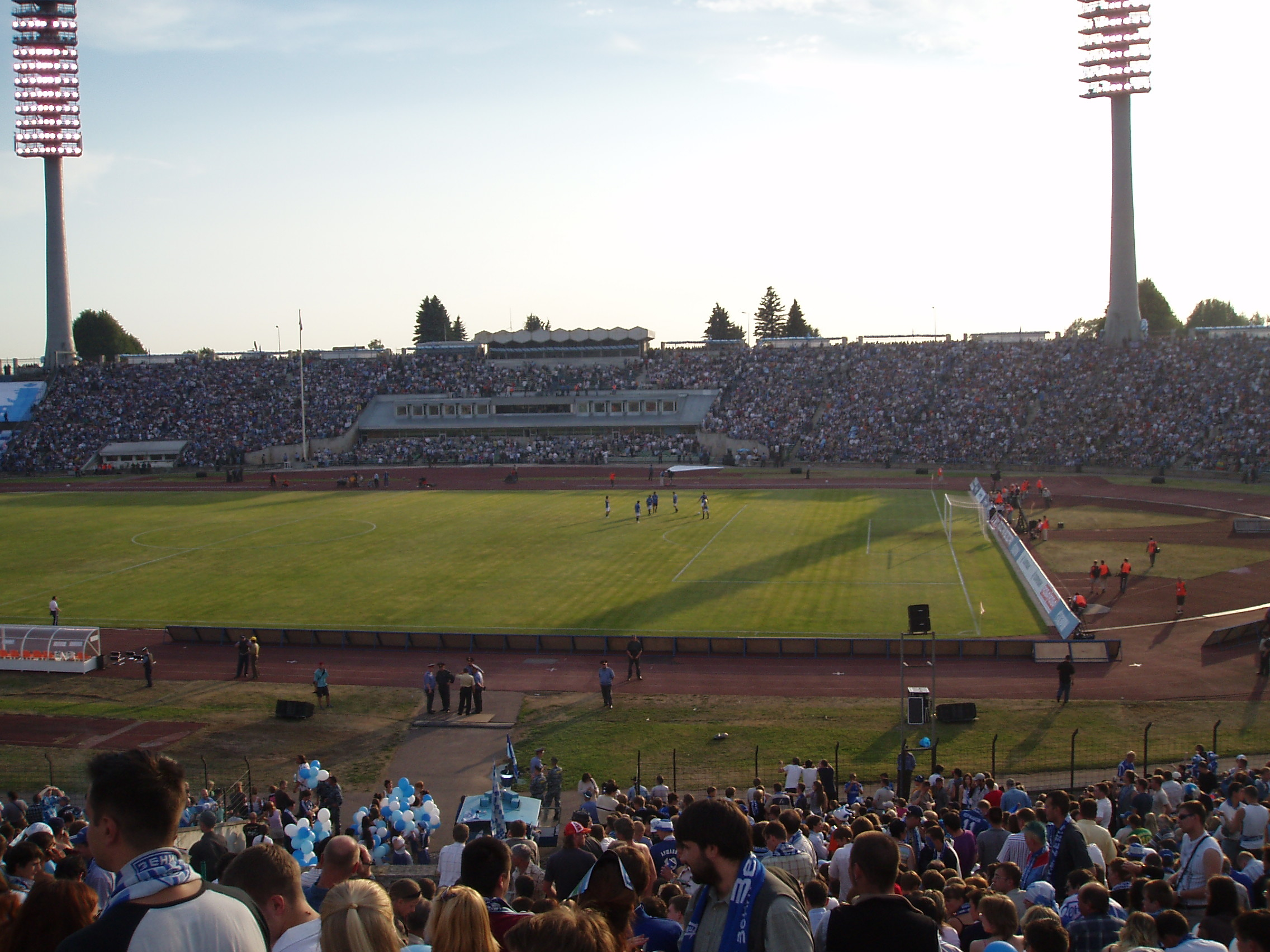
- Kirov Stadium
- Interactive map of Kirov Stadium
- Location: St. Petersburg, Russia
- Owner: Zenit Saint Petersburg
- Capacity: 100,000 (seating and standing); 84,000 (seating only)

Construction
- Opened: 30 July 1950
- Closed: 29 August 2006
- Demolished: 2006-2007

Tenant
- Zenit Saint Petersburg (1950–1989, 1992)

The SM Kirov Stadium was a multi-purpose stadium in St. Petersburg, Russia, and was one of the largest stadiums anywhere in the world. The stadium was named after Sergey Kirov.

== History ==
The stands of the Kirov stadium were located on the slopes of a circular artificial mound in the western part of Krestovsky Island, on the coast of the Gulf of Finland. Construction started in 1932, initial project was designed by architect Aleksandr Nikolsky and his workshop. During the 1930s and 1940s, construction was mainly focused on groundworks for the artificial mound on the sea shore. Construction was interrupted by World War II and the Siege of Leningrad, and resumed in 1945 with the return of citizens to Leningrad. Thousands of Red Army and Red Navy recruits were also conscripted as labor force for construction.

The stadium was opened on 30 July 1950 with the game between two main Leningrad teams, Zenit and Dynamo, drew 1-1. Initially, the stadium held 100,000 people (including 16,000 standing places).

For the match between Zenit and CSKA on 14 July 1951, additional temporary stands were installed, increasing the capacity of the stadium to 110,000. The stadium was sold out, and the attendance of 110,000 is the record for the Soviet football. The Kirov stadium was reconstructed to hold preliminary matches of the football tournament at the 1980 Summer Olympics. The capacity was reduced to 72,000.

In 1994, the stadium was used as the main arena for the St. Petersburg 1994 Goodwill Games. This was the last major international event at the Kirov Stadium, with participation of athletes from over 50 nations of the world. After the Goodwill Games, the stadium was used for several more years for football matches, as well as for athletics and training. In 2005, it was decided to demolish the main arena of the stadium and build a new one in its place. International competition for construction design of the new Zenit Stadium was won by architect Kisho Kurokawa.

The Kirov stadium was the home to Zenit football club in 1950–1989 and 1992. On 6 July 2006, Zenit decided to play a match against Dynamo Moscow at the Kirov stadium because of unavailability of pitch at the Petrovsky Stadium, the current Zenit ground. Part of the seats were already uninstalled because of planned deconstruction, so the match was visited by only 45,000 spectators despite the sold-out stadium.

The last official match at Kirov stadium was Petrotrest - Spartak Shelkovo on 17 August 2006. The visitors won 3-0.

The stadium was demolished in September 2006. A new stadium, the Krestovsky Stadium, was built on the site and opened in 2017.
