= Krestovsky Island =

Island in Saint Petersburg, Russia

Coordinates: 59.97°N 30.26°E

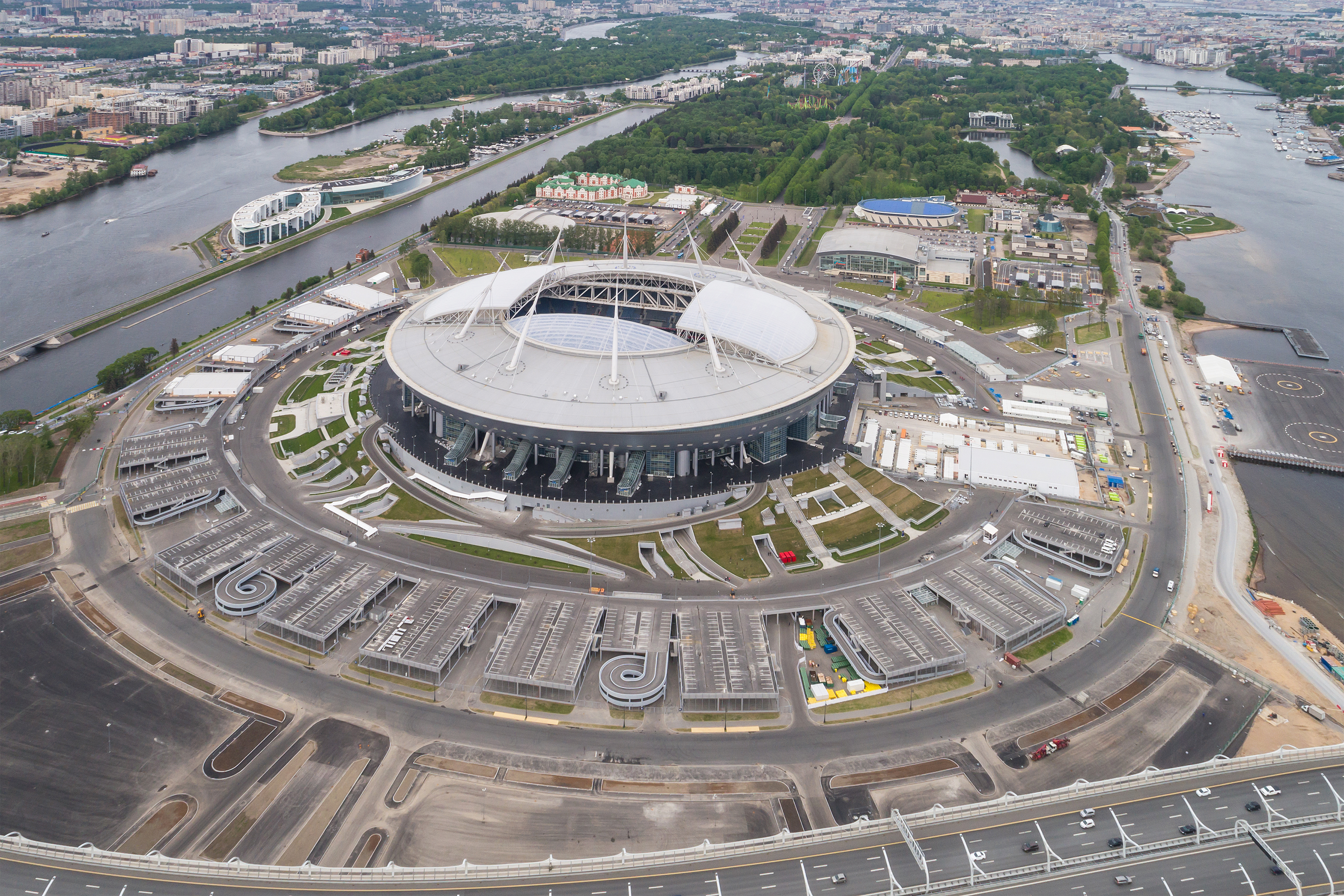
West part of Krestovsky Island, Gazprom Arena

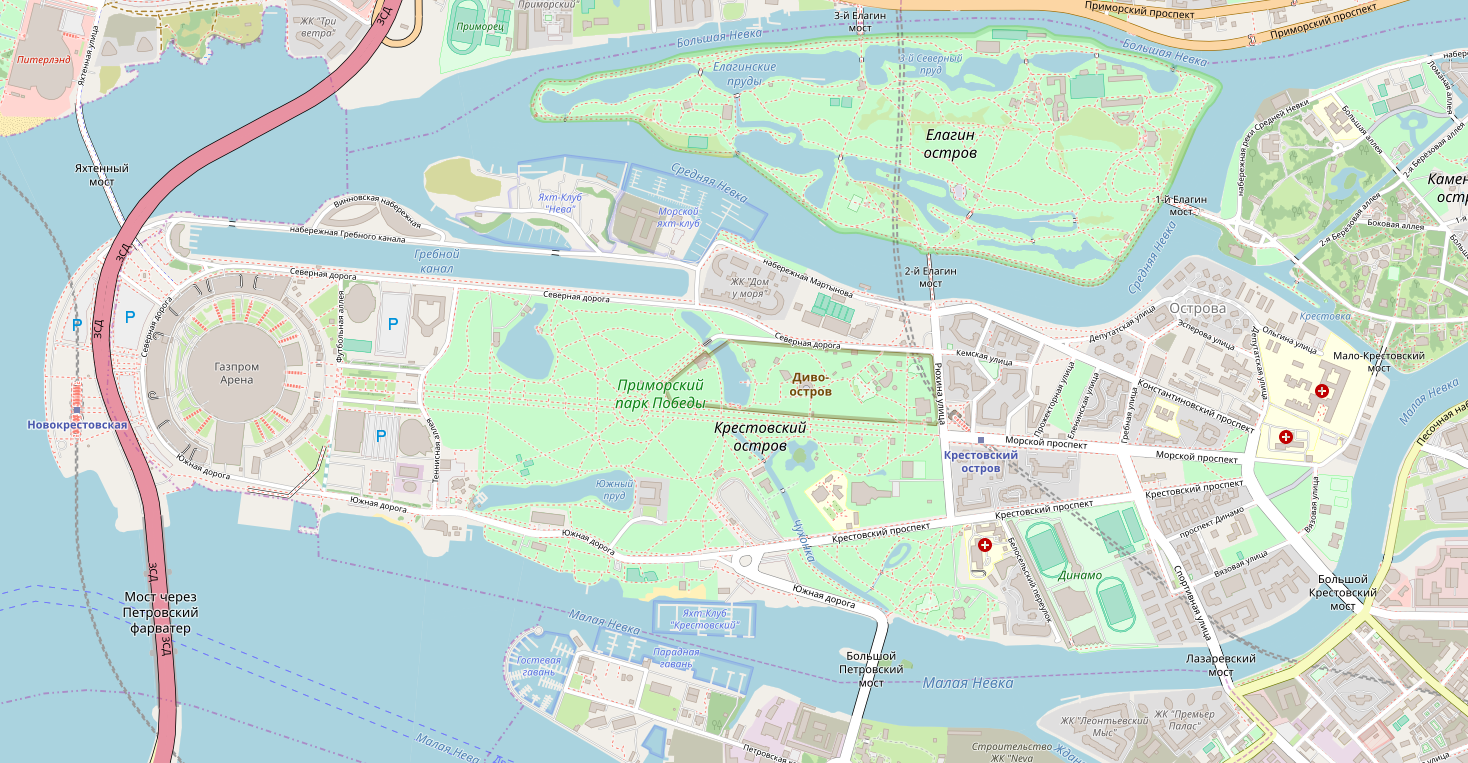
Krestovsky Island

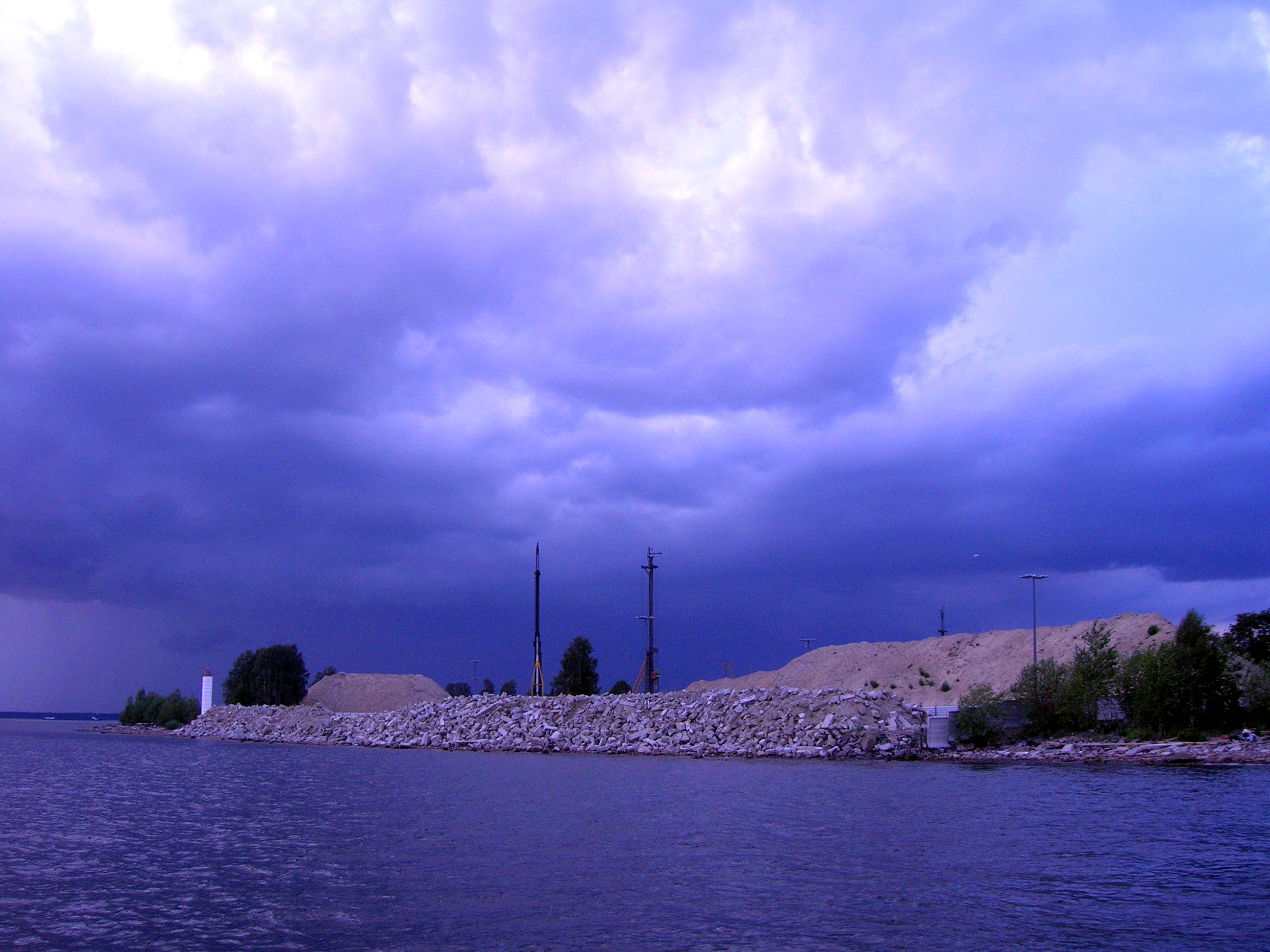
Krestovsky Island. Jetty

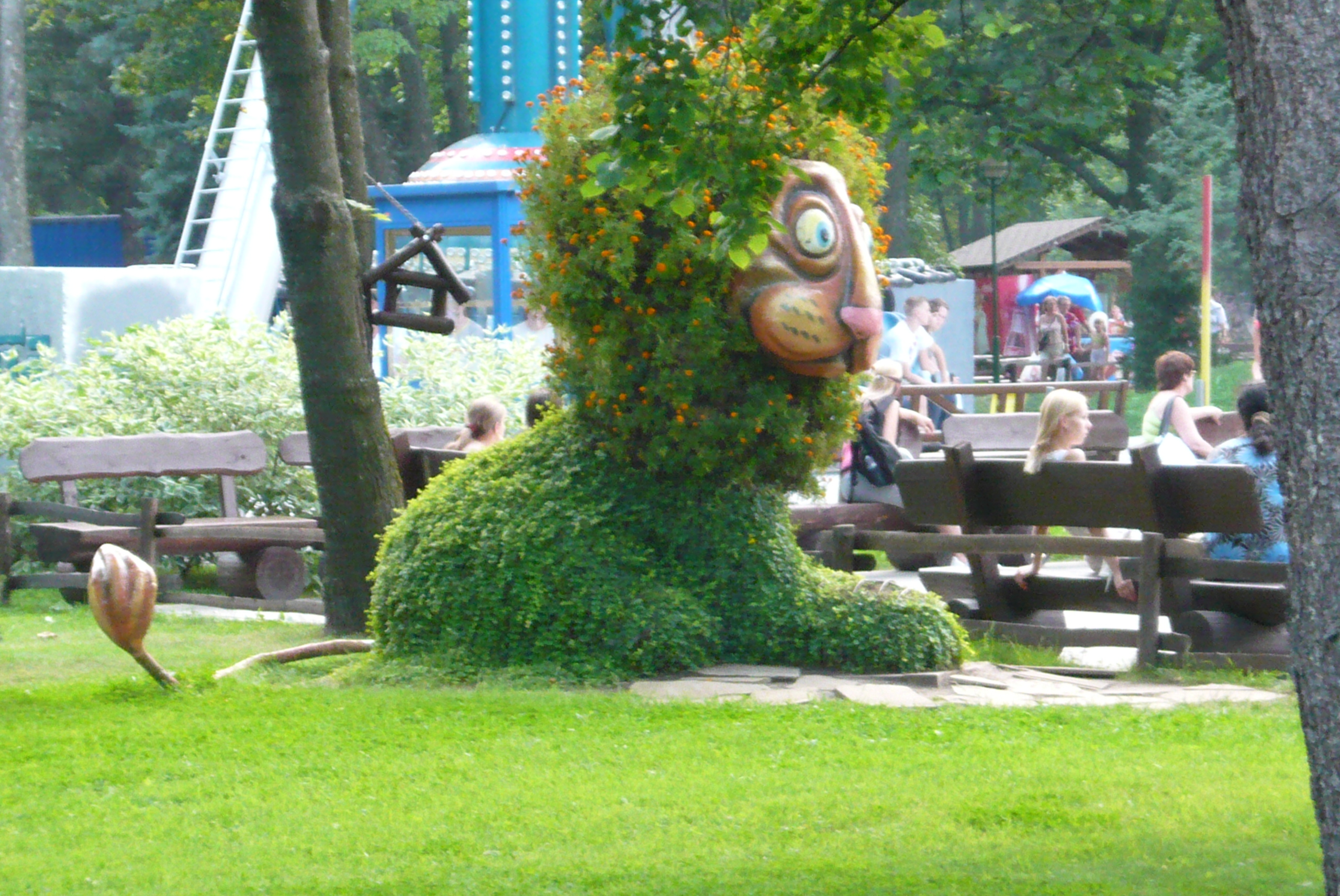
Krestovsky Island, Amusement park

Krestovsky Island (Russian: Крестовский остров) is a 3.4 km^{2} island in Saint Petersburg, Russia, between several tributaries of the Neva: the Srednyaya Nevka, the Malaya Nevka and the Krestovka. The island is served by the Krestovsky Ostrov station of Saint Petersburg Metro. Until recently, the western part of the island was occupied by the Maritime Victory Park, where the international Goodwill Games of sports and athletics competition took place in 1994, which was the first large scale post-Soviet Union international event in Russia. A new stadium, Gazprom Arena, is located where Kirov Stadium was. The stadium serves as home for FC Zenit Saint Petersburg.

Meanwhile, the eastern part of this Saint Petersburg island, has seen slow but steady urbanization since the early 1900s, which has slowly changed its parkland nature. Recently there has been even more pressure from today's "nomenclature" to locate top-end housing projects and high-prestige homes here - a long-time tendency that also continues today, since historically the island was always owned by families who were close to and favourites of the Tzars/"powers-to-be" and who served them well.

== History ==
The history of Krestovsky island and its near past up to the early 1900s is closely tied with the owners of the island, the Belosselsky-Belozersky family, and the way they developed and used the island. In the 19th through early 20th centuries the island belonged to the Belosselsky-Belozersky family. Aided by the infusion of wealth from the fortune of his second wife Anna Grigorievna (ne'e Kozitskaya and the wealth through her mother's Myasnikov family from Siberian mining and metals fortunes) Prince Alexander Mikhailovich Belosselsky-Belozersky acquired the island in 1803. Previously it had belonged to the courtier Count Cyril Razumovsky and his family. During the mid-1800s the Belosselskys reconstructed the original Razumovsky stone manor house, which was located at the southern shore of the island using the well-known architect A.I. Stackenschneider for the works. This house served the family as their summer retreat for years to come.

In the 1880s after having sold their famous Beloselsky-Belozersky Palace (the pink palace at No. 41 Nevsky Prospect at the Anichkov Bridge) to Grand Duke Sergei Alexandrovich Romanov (Nicholas II's uncle) the Belosselsky-Belozersky family moved to live on their Krestovsky island and the estate at the southern side of the island, now year-round. They reconstructed the original Stackenschneider designed manorial building into a small palace (using the contemporary court architect Rastrelli for its design). Popularly, this building was known as the "Datcha of the Belosselskys".

Many street names on Krestovsky island today still remind of and reflect the Belosselsky-Belozersky family having owned and occupied the Krestovsky island: e.g. Olgina, Eleninskaya, Esperova, Konstantinova streets have survived the change of times and herald the names of some of the Belosselsky-Belozersky immediate family members who lived on the island at the end of the Tsarist period until the 1917 Russian Revolution (Olga's street, Elena's street, Esper's street, Konstantin's street, respectively). Prior to the Revolution the main north to south street leading to the Belosselsky-Belozersky manor house was named Belosselsky Prospect (the Belosselsky avenue/view). After the Revolution of 1917, the street name was changed to Riukhina street (which runs South towards the edge of Malaya Nevka from the new Metro station on the island). The St Petersburg city council has approved and implemented, at the end of June 2011, the renaming of the lane one street over to the East and South of the Riukhina to "Belosselsky Pereulok" (the Belosselsky Lane), bringing back a relevant piece of the Krestovsky history and improving the awareness of this important period of the islands history. However, the Alexandrovskiy avenue (avenue named for the first Belosselsky owner of the island, Prince Alexander Mikhailovich Belosselsky), Nadezhdinskaya (wife of Konstantin Esperovich), Sergievskaya, Andrievskaya (sons of Sergei Konstantinovich), Mariinsky, (daughter of Konstantin Esperovich) as well as the Nikolayevsky and Vladimirsky streets (named for the Tsar and the Romanov Grand Duke respectively under whom some Belosselskys served as aide de camp during the last years of the Tsarist era), these all have been victims of urbanisation and disappeared under apartment blocks and Dynamo sports facilities built in the 1950s and since.

Two interesting streets and their names Yuriyuzanskaya and Vyazova still remain, reflecting two of the three main areas of metals and mining and the ironworks in the Urals, which were properties in Bashkiria/Bashkortostan (between Ufa and Cheliabinsk) owned by the Belosselsky family, (these also as a legacy of the marriage of Alexander Mikhailovich Belosselsky-Belozersky to Anna Grigorievna Kozitsky and her inheritance from Myasnikovs) and from where they drew some of their enormous wealth still during the end of the 19th century. The third such street, Katavskaya street, does not exist any longer. Katavskaya street was named for the ironworks of Ust-Katav and Katav-Ivanovsk, which were major producers of metals and metallurgy for the Belosselskys' enterprises. This street used to run parallel to the Belosselsky Prospect, immediately east of it and on the southern side of Morskoy prospect and has since the 1950s building of apartment "massifs" (blocks) been overtaken by these and "Dinamo" club's sporting venues and fields. The current Dinamo Prospect has replaced the former Alexandrovskii Prospect as the avenue leading from the Krestovsky Most (Bridge) in the eastern bridge-led entry to the island toward the Belosselsky-Belozersky summer palace/manor house, formerly the main conduit to the manor house but now blocked by the Dinamo sports fields and other adjacent constructed buildings.

Finally, the Novorossiskaya street, which also was overtaken by these same buildings and sports fields, ran parallel to the Katavskaya street to its east. This street was named in honor of Sergei Constantinovich being the commander of His Majesty's Third Dragoons of Novorossiisk Dragoons' Regiment. The same fate has fallen to the southwestern embankment of the island, which was named Amerikanskaya ulitsa (American street) in honor of the nationality of Sergey Constantinovich' wife Suzy Belosselsky-Belozersky ne'e Susan Tucker-Whittier (daughter of US Army General Charles Whittier).

== Early sports venue for tennis, polo, sailing, rowing and others ==
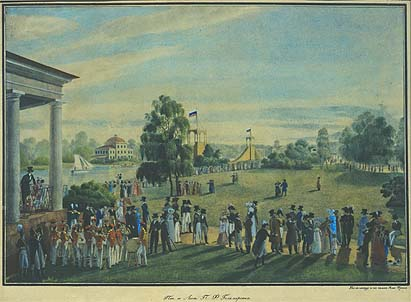
Karl Bryullov, Celebration on Krestovsky Island, 1823

On Krestovsky island, many "first" Russian sports venues and activities were launched with Belosselsky-Belozersky active support. The Krestovsky tennis club "Lawn Tennis Club", (with the main efforts undertaken by the resident Scotsman Arthur MacPherson, whose sons were some of the first Russian tennis champions with George Vasilievich Bray, who is considered to have been the first Russian Champion. George was also the Treasurer of the Krestovsky Lawn Tennis Club; See the note at the bottom of this paragraph for more information) Belosselsky horse polo grounds, as well as a yacht club and a rowing club were launched here in late 19th century along with a clay pigeon shooting range; memoirs by well known socialites of the late 1900s (i.e. princess Orbeliani) mention also a basic golf links on the island; all prior to the 1917 Revolution.

The island was always a center for sports and recreation for the St. Petersburg residents. Prior to the revolution, it was also a unique gathering place and venue for the "high-society" active in sports, the military officers and foreign diplomats, who participated in the horse polo events organized by the Belosselsky-Belozerskys. As this sport was known to be a preferred sport of Englishmen at the time, the elder prince Belosselsky-Belozersky, Constantine Esperovich, became known as the "Angloman" for his keen interest in promoting this sport. His elder son, prince Sergei Constantinovich was one of the first Russian international players of polo and took part regularly in the annual events in England and France at Rugby, Paris Bagatelle, Deauville, Biarritz, Pau, etc. He organized many horse polo competitions on their Krestovsky island estate polo grounds, including international team events. Well known visiting and resident international players of the time included British Ambassador Charles Hardinge, 1st Baron Hardinge of Penshurst (later Viceroy of India), British embassy secretaries Beaumont, Sperling, American Ambassador George von L. Meyer and Chargé d'Affaires Spencer Eddy were among the company of the first local Russian players, who in addition to the Belosselskys, were Grand Duke Boris Vladimirovich of Russia, Grand Duke Dmitri Pavlovich of Russia, Prince Michael Cantacuzène-Speranski, Count Kinsky, Messrs. Mouravi and Grabovski. A special frequent player was Sergei Constantinovich's fellow general, later a Finnish Marshal, Carl Gustaf Mannerheim, who also was part of the inauguration competition of the Krestovsky polo field, in the summer of 1897.

Sergei Constantinovich was also a founder and sponsor of an early St. Petersburg athletics club named "Sport", which was located on Krestovsky island. His activities led to him being invited to become a Russian representative to the International Olympic Committee (IOC). This made him the second all-time Russian and 28th overall representative to this venerable and still very active key international sports body. Prince Sergei acceded the IOC together with count Ribaupierre, after Major-General A.D. Butovsky and before prince Troubetzkoy. In capacity of the IOC member, prince Sergei participated in the organizational committee of the 1900 Paris Olympic games and took part in equestrian events.

The younger son of prince Constantin, prince Esper Constantinovich Beloselsky-Belozersky was an avid sailor and won an Olympic bronze medal in sailing (10 meter class) for Russia in the 1912 Stockholm Olympics as helmsman of the "Gallia II".

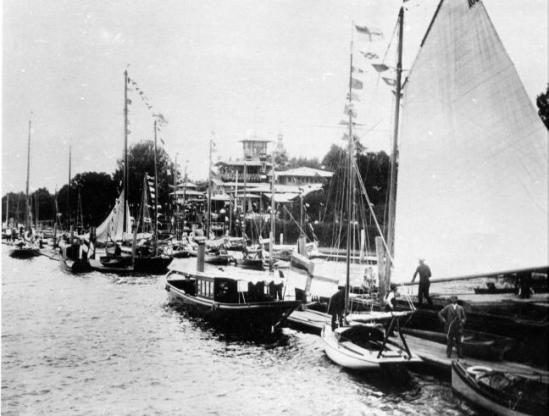
Yacht club on Krestovsky Island.

For sailing, the Krestovsky island was an ideal venue as it was here that the first Russian yacht clubs, "The Nevsky Flot" was launched by no other than Peter the Great in 1718. The club is still active, although it has undergone several episodes of transformations, but is located on the Martynova Embankment at the North shore of Krestovsky Island.

During the Soviet times, as well, the Krestovsky island was the base of many of the most successful sport and rowing clubs; among other, Energia and Krasnoe Znamia. Some fourteen Olympic champions came from this tradition. Founded in 1889 and active still on Krestovsky Island during the early 1990s as Znamia, the club produced Olympic rowing champions Y. Tsykalov, V. Boreiko, O.Golovanov, and A. Klepikov, as well as three-time Olympic kayaking/canoeing champion L. Pinaeva. In addition the club produced several World and European champions. A tradition started after WWII by the Krestovsky rowers is still alive today. The autumn meet in rowing they started became an international competition and continues as such today-every first Sunday of October.

The island was also home to the Leningrad division of the "people's' committee on internal affairs (NKVD)" sports and football club "Dinamo". Dinamo's athletic fields and grounds as well as clubhouse in the "functional" architectural style of the 1930s is the area due east of the Belosselsky-Belozelsky rebuilt manor-house. These cover still a large area despite recent encroaching business and apartment/housing projects.

Today, Krestovsky island continues its tradition as a base for sports and recreation and is still the home to half a dozen tennis clubs, several boating and rowing clubs as well as the site of the new stadium of Zenit, officially known today as "Gazprom Stadion" replacing the Kirov stadium, which was built after the Second World War and which survived until the 1990s at the western spit of the island. Many contemporary Russian tennis players have come from the Krestovsky island tennis tradition of Russian champions, started by the Scot MacPherson, his sons as well as Mikhail Sumarokov-Elston and George Bray in the late 19th century. The best known was Svetlana Kuznetsova.

Although the island has changed significantly since the Russian Revolution in terms of its land use, even more so during the past decades, there is still the dominant presence of sports on Krestovsky.

== Belosselsky-Belozersky residence ==
Today, the Belosselsky-Belozersky residence on Krestovsky island has been reconstructed at the same location where it stood until the late 1950s (the original structure was damaged during the nearly 900-day siege of Leningrad, from shelling during World War II; it was repaired and used for various purposes, but was demolished around 1956). The rebuilt "Datcha" is true to the original architectural drawings but boasts all modern conveniences indoors, such as elevators, etc. It has been put on the market for sale recently. Meanwhile, the only original structures which remain of the Belosselsky-Belozersky era to these days are some horse stables on the now Riukhina street, present Belosselsky Pereulok/Lane and the landscaped park with a small pond and walkways around it adjacent on the north-western and western side of the area where the Belosselsky-Belozersky house stood and now stands again. There is also the unique "accent" piece of the estate remaining by the edge of the water, of the Malaya Nevka, due south of the property (and the rebuilt house). This is a dark rose colored granite stone structure, holding a bench circular steps enveloping the structure and leading to the water's edge, forming a landing for boats and offering a venue to view the Southern exposure from the estate. The structure, sitting under the shade of oak and linden trees, was draped with a wrought iron and bronze balustrade (original design of this structure was by a Swiss architect).

== Duel on Krestovsky Island ==
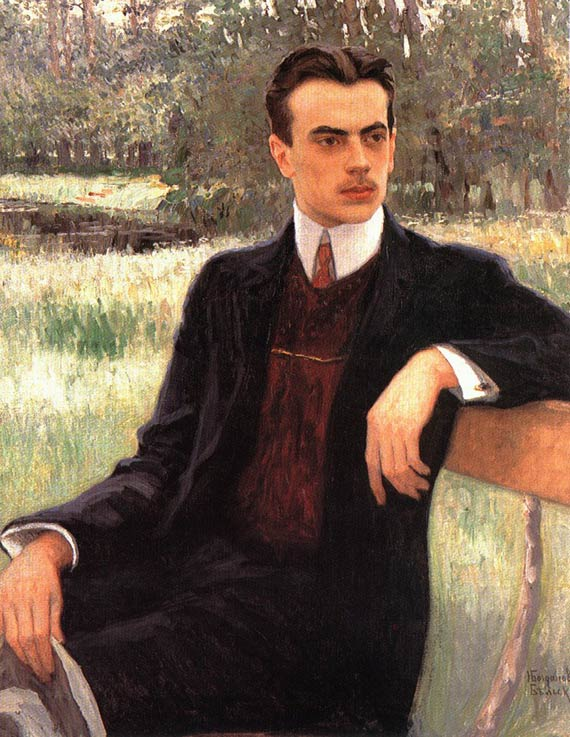
Posthumous portrait of Nikolai Yusupov

There was a duel between Prince Nicholas Yusupov, Count Sumarakoff-Elston, and Count Arvid Manteuffel, over Marina von Hayden, the latter's wife. Yusupov had caused a great open scandal by having an affair with the wife of the Imperial Horse Guards' officer. It seems Felix Yusupov, his younger brother, had organized their first meeting. The deadly encounter took place at dawn on July 5, 1908, when Count Manteuffel and Prince Yusupov met in a duel on the Krestovsky park land grounds of the estate owned by Belosselsky-Belozersky family, at the time Constantin Esperovich.

The parties and their seconds met as agreed at dawn on the 5th of July 1908. Nikolai Yusupov was mortally wounded by the second round of shots and died.

== Rasputin ==
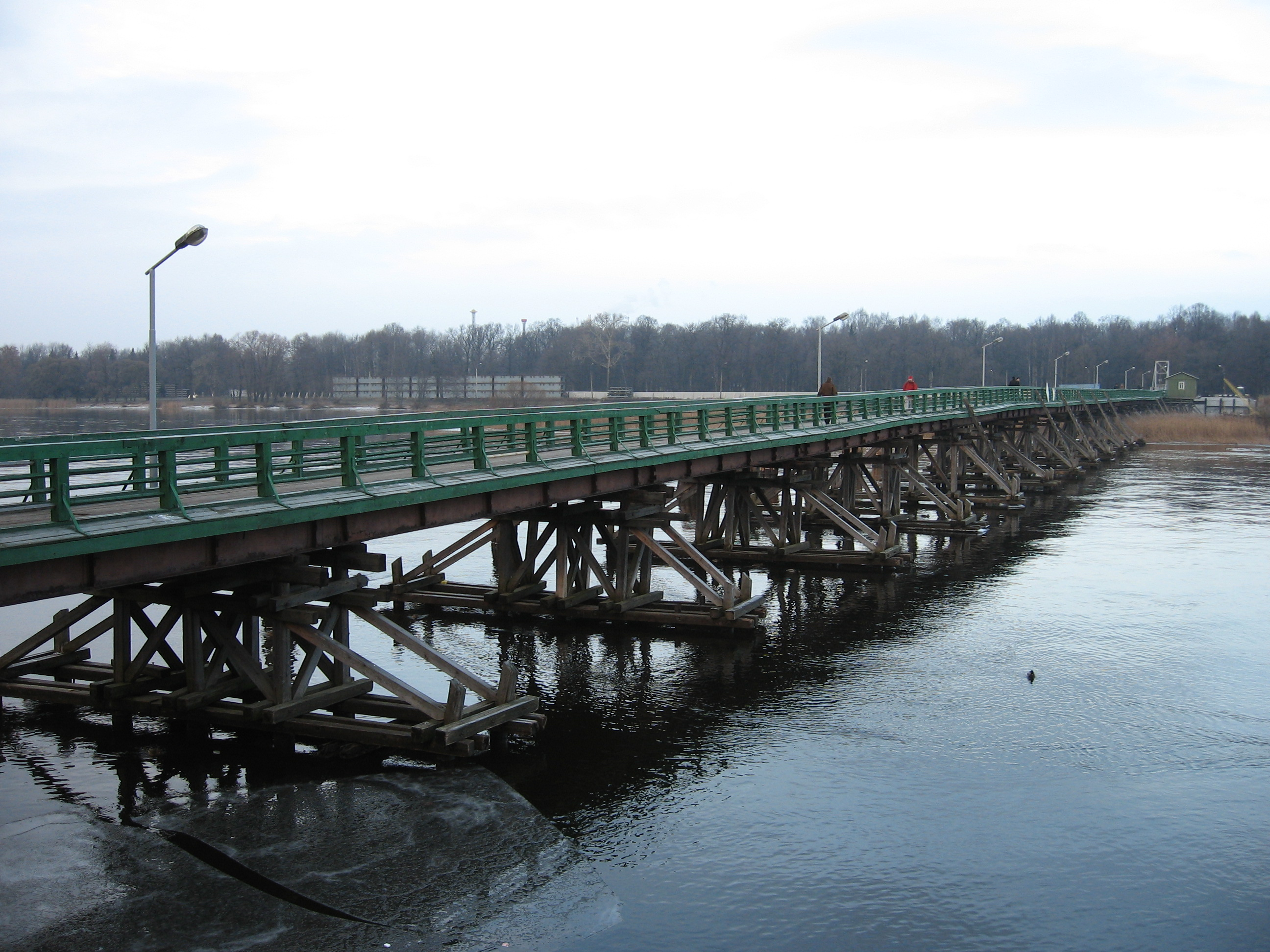
The old bridge (since 1838).

On 1 January 1917 (Old Style) the corpse of Grigory Rasputin was found close to the Bolshoy Petrovsky Bridge, off Krestovsky Island. From Maurice Paleologue's diary who was the last French Ambassador to Imperial Russia (the description is often questioned as being a historically correct description of the event...).

Tuesday, January 2, 1917.

Rasputin's corpse was discovered yesterday in the ice of the little Nevka, alongside Krestovsky Island and near the Belosselsky palace. Up to the last moment, the Empress had been hoping that "God would spare her comforter and only friend." The police are not allowing any details of the drama to be published. Besides, the Okhrana is pursuing its enquiries in such secrecy that even this morning Trepov; the President of the Council, replied to the impatient questions of the Grand Duke Nicholas Michailovitch: "Monseigneur, I swear to you that I have nothing whatever to do with what is going on, and know nothing of the enquiry." There was great rejoicing among the public when it heard of the death of Rasputin the day before yesterday. People kissed each other in the streets and many went to burn candles in Our Lady of Kazan. When it was known that the Grand Duke Dimitri Pavlovich was one of the assassins there was a crush to light candles before the ikons of Saint Dimitri. The murder of Grigori is the sole topic of conversation among the unending queues of women who wait in the snow and wind at the doors of the butchers and grocers to secure their share of meat, tea, sugar, etc. They are saying that Rasputin was thrown into the Neva alive, and approvingly quoting the proverb: "A dog's death for a dog!" They are also whispering that the Grand Duchess Tatiana, the Emperor's second daughter, witnessed the drama disguised as a lieutenant of the Chevaliers-Gardes so that she could revenge herself on Rasputin who had tried to violate her. And carrying the vindictive ferocity of the moujik into the world of the Court, they add that to satiate her thirst for vengeance the dying Grigori was castrated before her eyes.

Another popular story is this: "Rasputin was still breathing when he was thrown under the ice of the Malaya Neva. It is very important, for if so he will never become a saint." It is a fact that the Russian masses believe that the drowned can never be canonized.

— AN AMBASSADOR'S MEMOIRS

== Sources ==
- "Dvorets Belosselsky-Belozersky", Maria Petrovna Zeliadt, Beloje i Chornoje, St Petersburg 1996.
- Letter of V.N. Soloviev, Director of Teaching-Sports Center "Znamia", 18.02.1992, No. 13. licensed under "Leningrad oblast counsel of professional unions", where solicitation made for reconstruction of Belosselsky-Belozersky "datcha" according to drawings from year 1954 (at an estimated cost of 150-200 million roubles (of 1992 value)). Letter also lists "Znamia" center as one of the oldest for Russian rowing sports (100 years in 1989) and the referenced champions from the club (refers to letter act No 5/1807 of 25.04.1990 and letter of management of "Gosinspektia" regarding conservation of "pamietnikow" (monuments/memorials) No 7/721 of 14.03. 1990).
- (In Russian) "Dacha Belosselskikh-Belozerskikh na Krestovskom Ostrove, Istoricheskaya Spravka", Sostavitel, Zorina A.M., Sankt Peterburg, 1991. (Describes Krestovsky island and history of the ownership of Krestovsky island, the buildings, etc.).
- (In Russian) "Kirovskie ostrova" (Kirov Islands), H.D. Sintsov, Leningrad 1937.
- (In Russian) "Parki Pobedi" (Victory Parks), V.I. Markov, Leningrad, 1956 and 1962.
- (In Russian) "Nevskii ostrova" (Neva river islands), V.A. Vitjazev, Leningrad, 1986.
- "Квартальный надзиратель", St. Petersburg, 2005, 2007; Article, ("Усадьба Белосельских-Белозерских станет отелем").
- "POLO", von Heinrich Hasperg jr., Chevalier Verlag, 2010, Beatrice Tiple, Aachen. Reprint of 1907 original, (Neu editierter Nachdruck der Ausgabe 1907, erschienen bei Grethlein & Co.). Printed in Germany. ISBN 978-3-941551-02-2.
- "MODERN POLO" by CAPTAIN E. D. MILLER, D.S.O, edited by M. H. HAYES, (F.R.C.V.S.) author of "Points of the Horse", "Illustrated Horse-breaking", "Veterinary Notes for Horse Owners", "Riding and Hunting", etc. SECOND EDITION, REVISED AND ENLARGED. LONDON : HURST AND BLACKETT, LIMITED, NEW YORK : CHARLES SCRIBNER'S SONS, 1902 (References to early Russian polo; Belosselsky polo grounds at Krestovsky, Sergei Konstantinovich Belosselsky as an international player; Belosselsky polo pony by the name of "Negress").
- "In the Name of Russia", Russia Abroad Publishing House, New York 1965.
- "Memoirs of Prince Sergei Sergeivich Belosselsky-Belozersky", Sergei Sergeivich Belosselsky-Belozersky, edited by Marvin Lyons; Jacques Ferrand, Paris 1989.
- "Killed in a Duel", Article in "New York Times", Published: July 6, 1908.
- "His brother's keeper" by Gretchen Haskin, Part 2, Originally published in Atlantis Magazine, volume 2, issue 4, 2000. (Recounts and annotates the information regarding the duel between Manteuffel and Sumarakoff-Elston).
- "THE 1900 OLYMPIC GAMES", by Bill Mallon; (RESULTS OF THE EARLY MODERN OLYMPICS), Jefferson, North Carolina, and London. ISBN 0-7864-0378-0. McFarland & Company, Inc., Publishers (references to Sergei Sergeievich Belosselsky participation into 1900 Paris Olympic Games' organisational committee as representative of Russia to the IOC).
- "Guide to the Great Siberian Railway", Ministry of Ways and Communication. Edited by A.I. Dmitriev-Mamonov and A.F. Zdziarsky,(English translation by Miss L. Kukol-Yasnopolsky; Revised by John Marshall). St. Petersburg, Artistic Printing Society, 1900 (pp. 100–101 ref. Belosselsky-Belozersky metal, ironworks of Ust-Katav, Vyazovaya, Katav-Ivanovsk and Yuriuzan).
