= Kamenny Islands =

Island in Saint Petersburg, Russia

Каменные острова
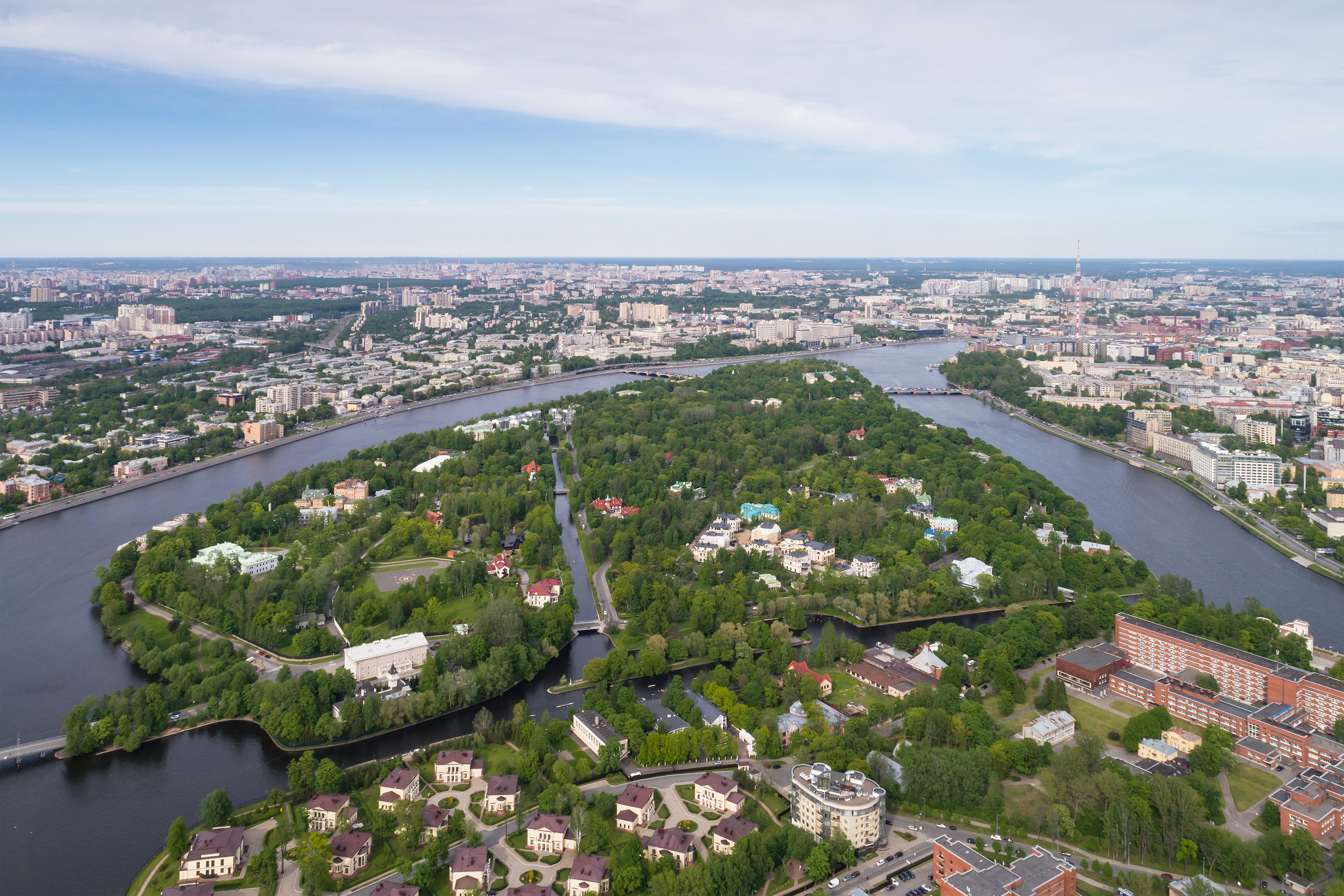
- Aerial photo of the Kamenny Island

- Location within Saint Petersburg Location within European Russia Location within Europe

Geography
- Location: Gulf of Finland
- Coordinates: 59.98°N 30.29°E
- Archipelago: Kamenny Islands
- Total islands: 3
- Area: 5.4 km^{2} (2.1 sq mi)
- Length: 5.3 km (3.29 mi)
- Width: 1.9
- Highest elevation: 18 m (59 ft)

Administration
- Russian Federation
- Region: Saint Petersburg

Kamenny Islands (Russian: Каменные острова, Kamenny Ostrova, meaning 'Stony Islands') are a group of three islands in the Neva delta, in Saint Petersburg, Russia.

== Geography ==
The three islands are flat. They are divided by channels and have bridges connecting each other, as well as the group with the mainland. The Kamenny Islands are part of the city of Saint Petersburg.

=== Kamenny Island ===
Kamenny Island (Russian: Каменный остров, meaning 'Stone Island'), with an area of 1.06 km^{2}, it is the easternmost island and gives its name to the group. It was renamed as Workers' Island (Russian: остров Трудящихся) in Soviet times. Since that era and to this day, government residences have been located on Kamenny Island.

=== Yelagin Island ===
Yelagin Island (Russian: Елагин остров) lies in the centre/north, where the Yelagin Palace is located.

=== Krestovsky Island ===
Krestovsky Island (Russian: Крестовский остров) is the westernmost and largest island. It is the location of the Kamenny Island Palace.

== History of Kamenny Island ==
Peter the Great presented Kamenny Island to Count Gavriil Golovkin, Chancellor of the Russian Empire. After his family fell into disgrace, the island passed to his successor, Count Aleksei Petrovich Bestuzhev-Ryumin. A decade later, Empress Elizabeth granted it to the future Peter III of Russia.

During the 19th century, the island was home to summer retreats ("dachas") of the Russian royalty and nobility. At the easternmost tip of the island stands the Kamennoostrovsky Palace, built by Georg von Veldten for Paul I and the Neo-Gothic church of Saint John of Jerusalem (1776–81) constructed in honor of the victory at Chesma and frequented by Alexander Pushkin during his stay at a dacha on Kamenny Ostrov. A cluster of Pushkin's last poems, including his version of Exegi monumentum, date from that period.

To the west lies a park with numerous mansions from the beginning of the 20th century, and some of the finest Moderne constructions in the city: the Shene Mansion (3 Skvoznoi Proyezd), the Follenweider Mansion (13 Bolshaya Alleya) and the Meltser Mansion (8 Polevaya Alleya). The Polovtsov Dacha (1911–13), with its opulent interiors, is a gem of the 20th-century Neoclassicism.

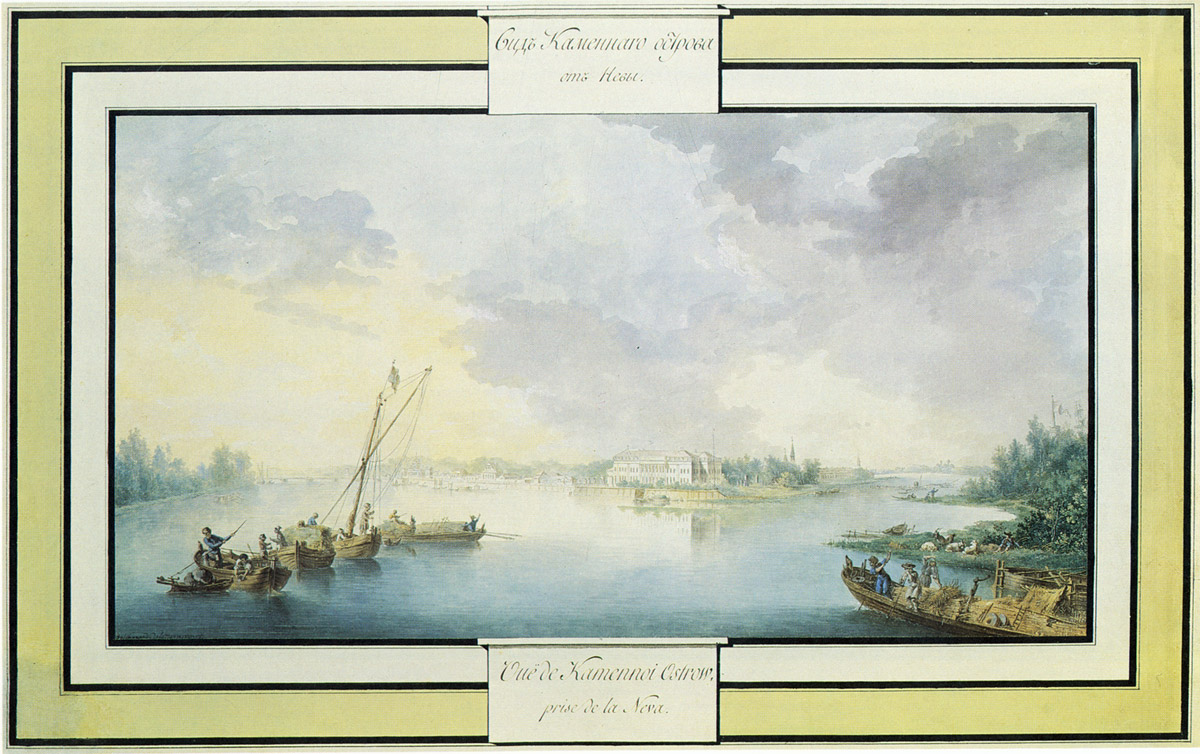
Landscape of Kamenny Island in 1786

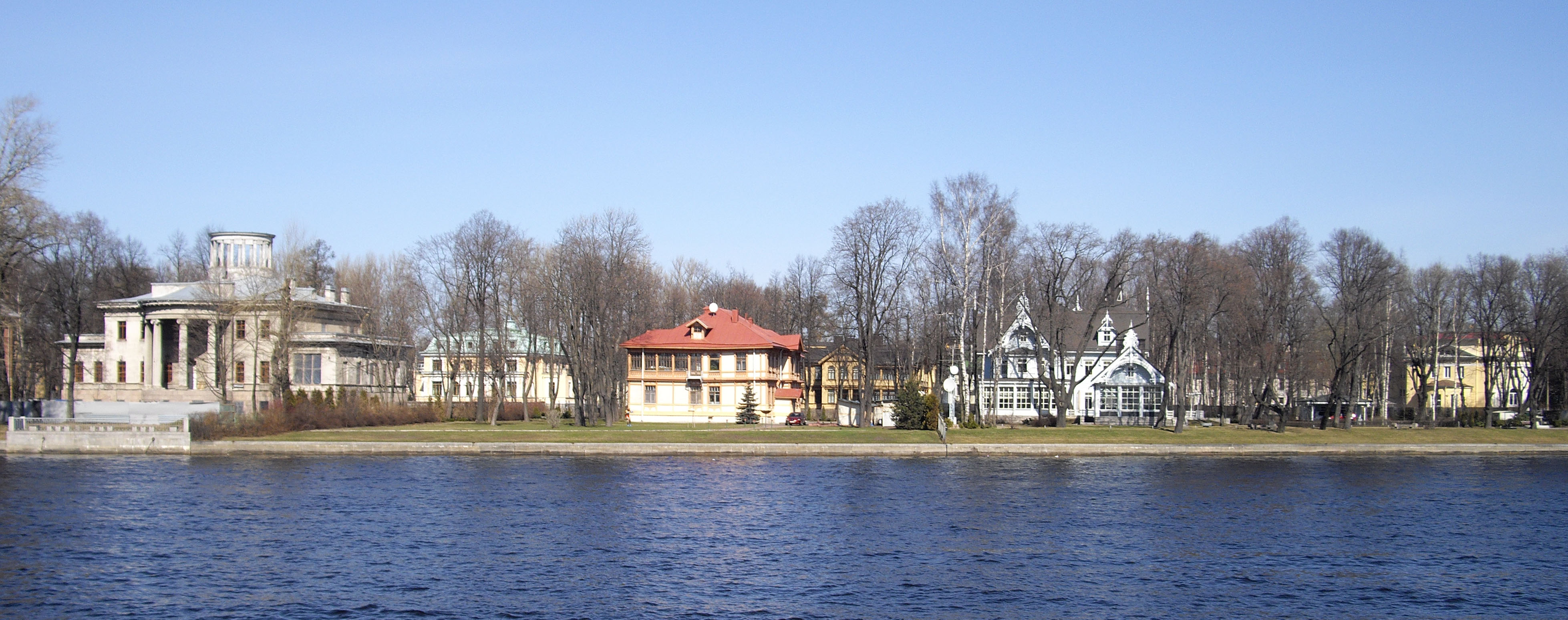
Kamenny Island in 2011. View over the Malaya Nevka River.
