= Alexander Park (Saint Petersburg) =

Park in Saint Petersburg, Russia

Coordinates: 59.964°N 30.290°E

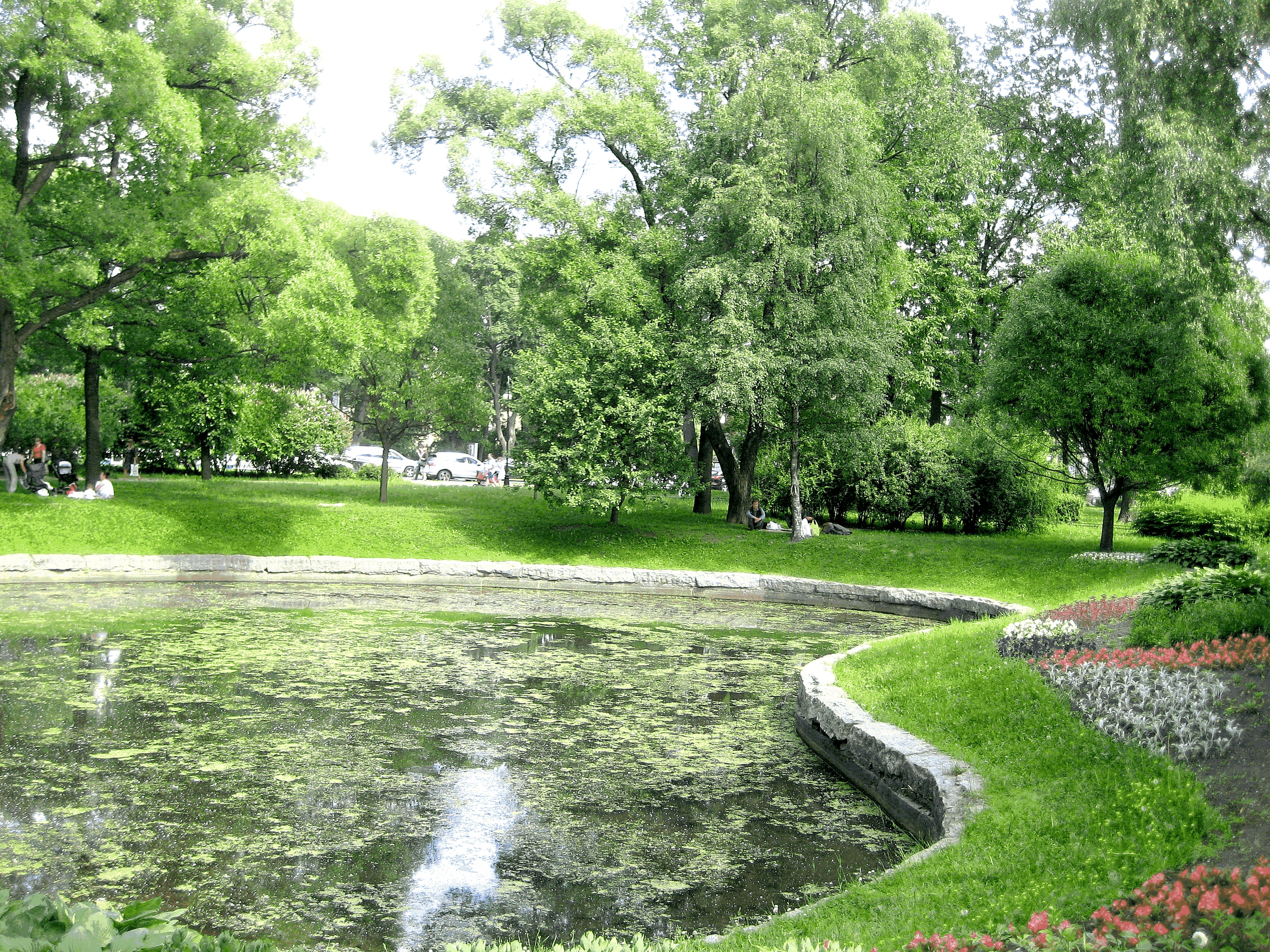
Classic park

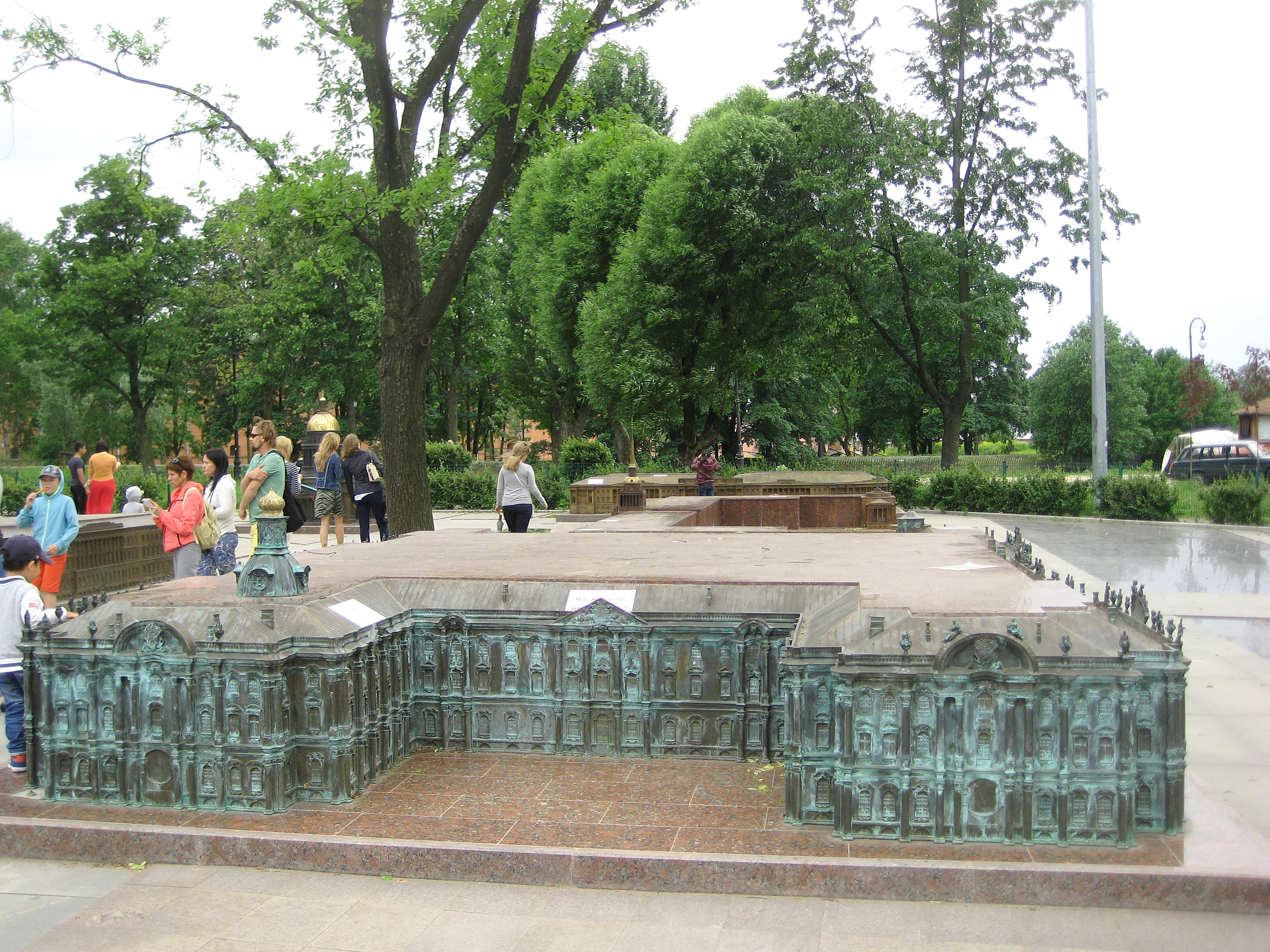
Miniature park

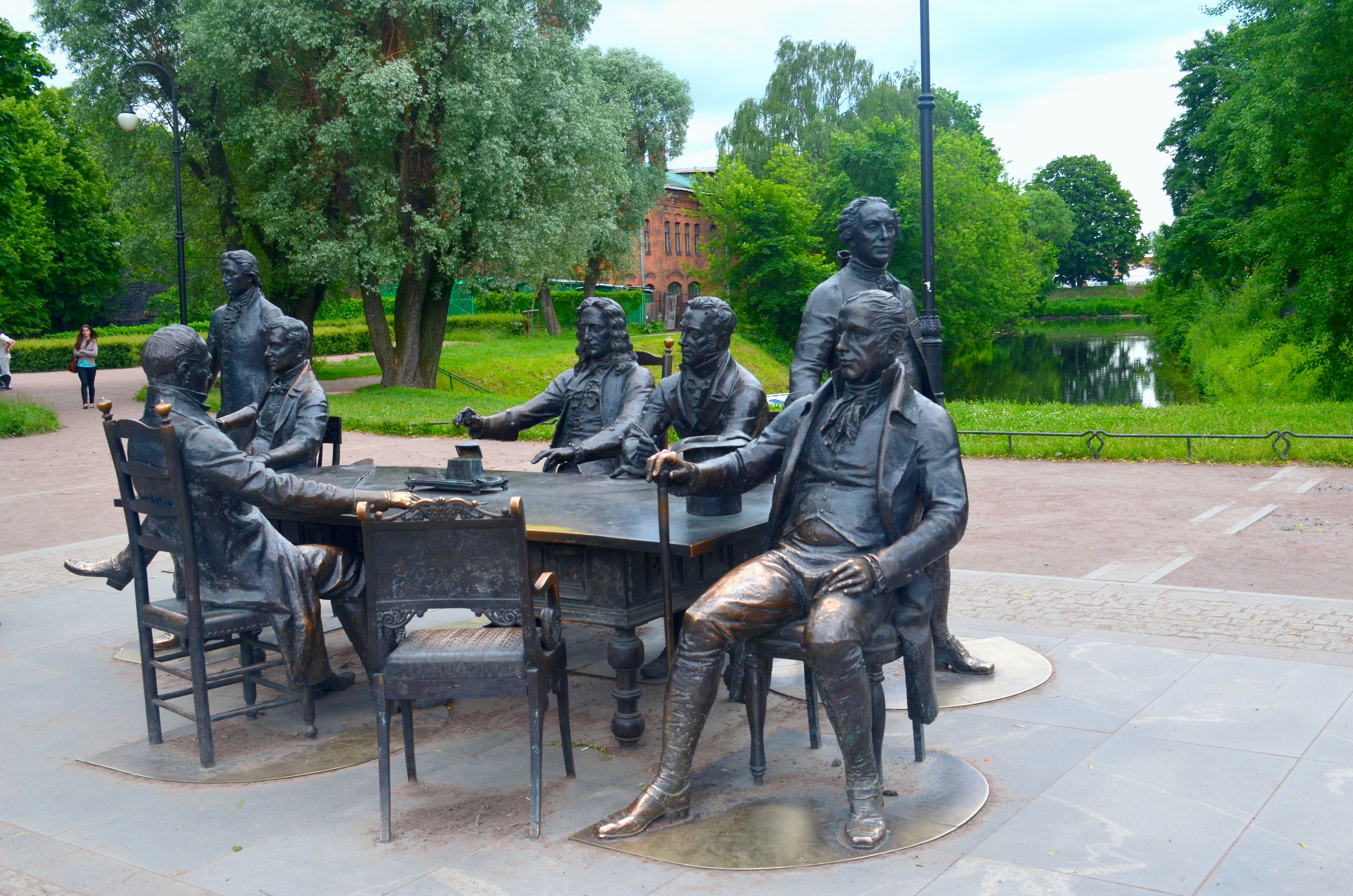
The Architects

Alexander Park or Alexandrovsky Park (Russian: Алекса́ндровский парк) is a park on Petrogradsky Island of Saint Petersburg, Russia. It is one of the first public parks in St. Petersburg.

== Structures ==
The park has a semicircular/crescent shape. The Leningrad Zoo is the largest occupant of the park. The other end of the park is the Northwestern Branch of the Russian State University of Justice. A canal separates the park from the Kronverk (now the Artillery Museum), which otherwise would be at the center of the area. To the south of the park and the Kronverk is the Kronverksky Strait, beyond which is the Peter and Paul Fortress.

The northern half of the park are occupied by (from west to east):

- an interactive children's theater (Skazkin Dom),
- Music-Hall (Мюзик-Холл): a medium-sized venue for plays and shows,
- St. Petersburg Planetarium,
- the Baltic House Festival Theatre,
- Velikan Park (Великан Парк "giant park"): a modern cinema with a food court,
- a couple of restaurants,
- Gorkovskaya metro station.

== Artworks ==
It has the only outdoor miniature park in Russia: Mini-Gorod (Мини-город "mini-town").

The Architects (Зодчие), a bronze sculptural group by Alexander Taratynov was installed on June 15, 2011. Commissioned by Gazprom, it depicts the great architects of the Russian Empire. For a statue of a French architect Thomas de Thomon, the image of British chemist and mineralogist Thomas Thomson was mistakenly used. Taratynov blamed Wikipedia for the error but also himself for not checking with a historian to verify the image he used was accurate.
