= Kronverksky bridge =

Small bridge in Saint Petersburg, Russia

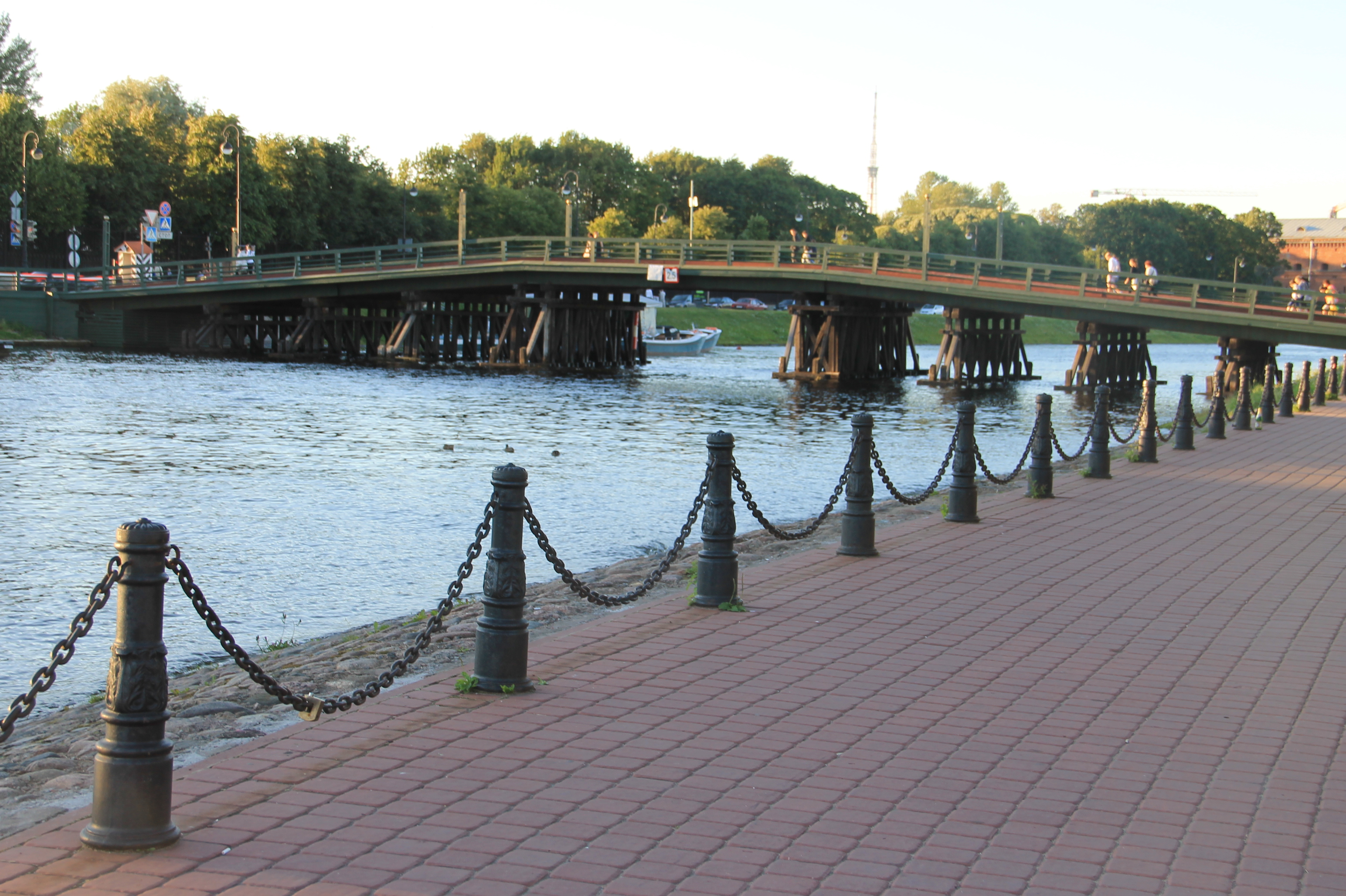
The Kronverksky bridge

Kronverksky bridge is a bridge over the Kronverksky Strait in the Petrogradsky District of Saint Petersburg, Russia.

== Location ==
Konverksky bridge connects Hare Island and Petrogradsky Island. There is the Ioannovsky bridge upstream.

The nearest metro station is Gorkovskaya.

== History ==
The name of the bridge is given by the name of the Kronverksky Strait. The steep curve of the bridge surface, which provides a sufficient height of the average navigable span, caused the emergence of another unofficial name - "humpback".

The bridge was built in 1938 under the project of engineer P. P. Stepnov. The bridge originally had a metal roof only over the navigable span. In 1978, the Lenmosttrest repair and construction Department made a major repair of the bridge: all spans were covered with metal beams, the wooden flooring was divided into sidewalks and roadways.

According to the Decree of the Government of the Russian Federation No. 527 dated to 10.07.2001, the Kronverksky bridge is an object of historical and cultural heritage of federal significance. In September 2015, the bridge was declared an emergency. According to the report of the St. Petersburg State Unitary Enterprise "Mostotrest", the decay of individual elements of the bridge was 79%. Work on the elimination of accidents was completed until June 2016.

== Structure ==
The bridge supports are wooden frame on a pile base. In each support, two rows of six piles are hammered. The superstructure consists of metal beams. The railing is wooden.

The length of the bridge along the back wall of the abutments is 57.5 m, the width of the bridge between the railings is 8.8 m.

== See also ==
- List of bridges in Saint Petersburg
