= Military Historical Museum of Artillery, Engineers and Signal Corps =

Military museum in St Petersburg, Russia

Coordinates: 59.9539°N 30.3138°E

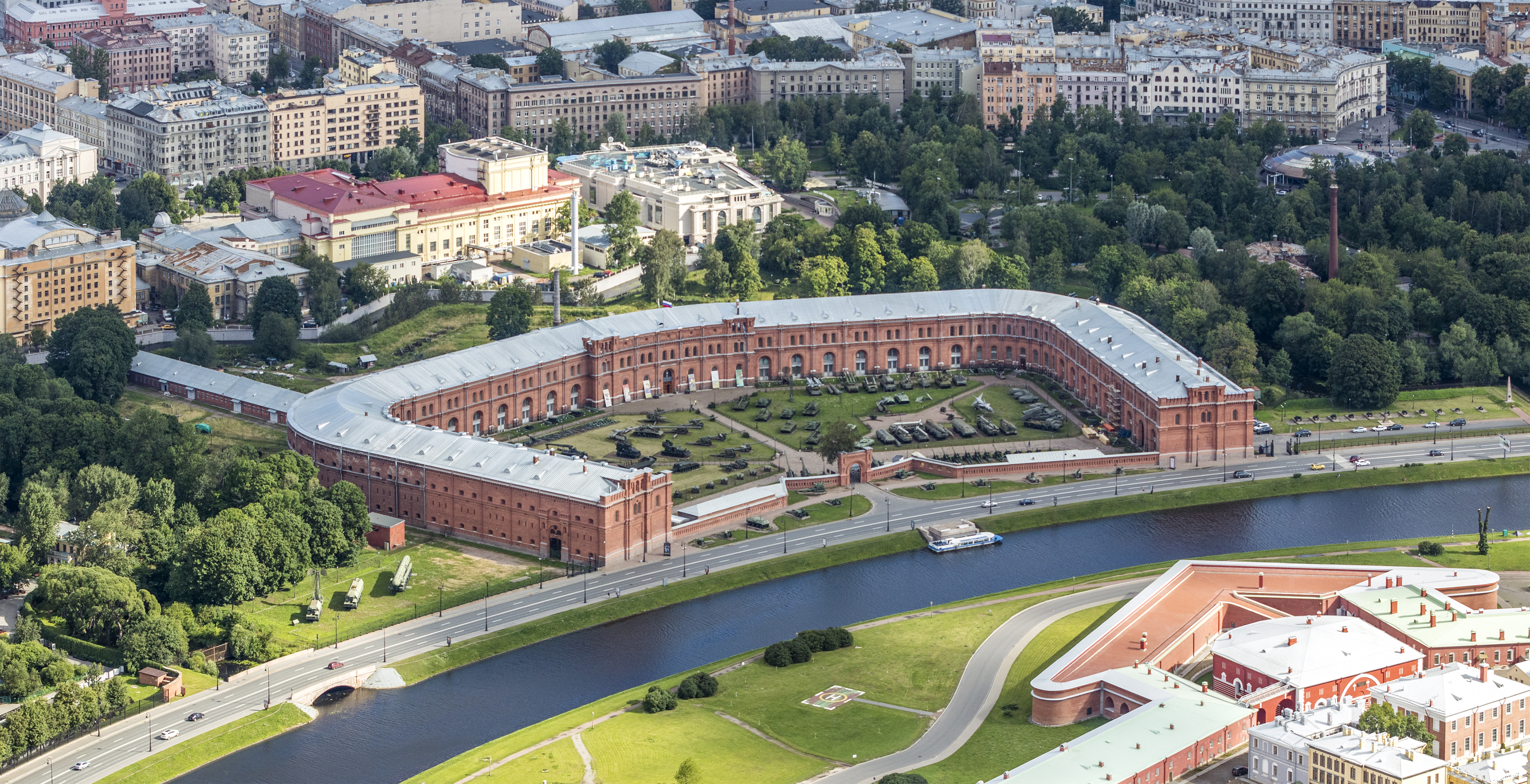
Aerial view of the Artillery Museum in the Kronverk

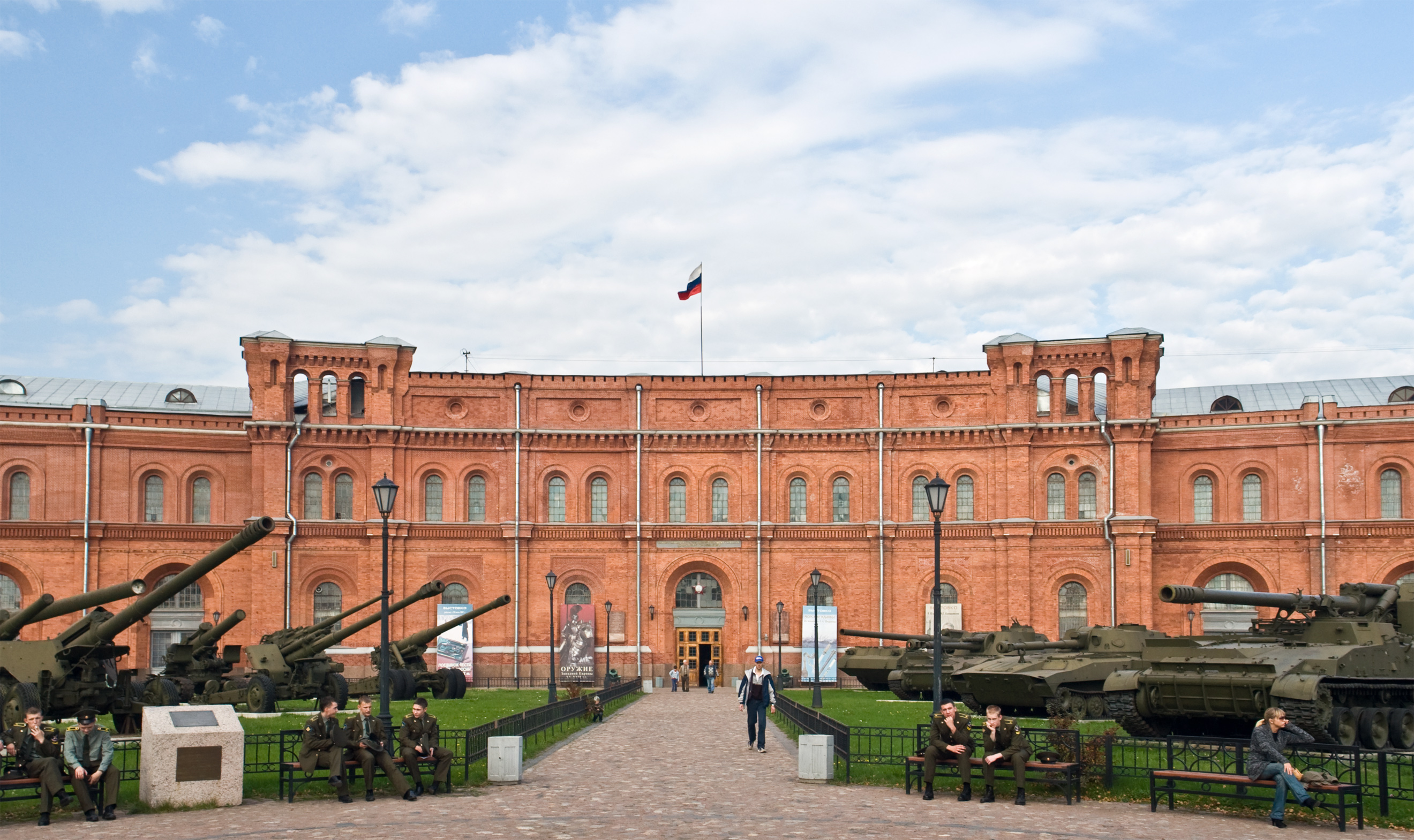
The museum as viewed from immediately inside the entrance to the outdoor exhibition

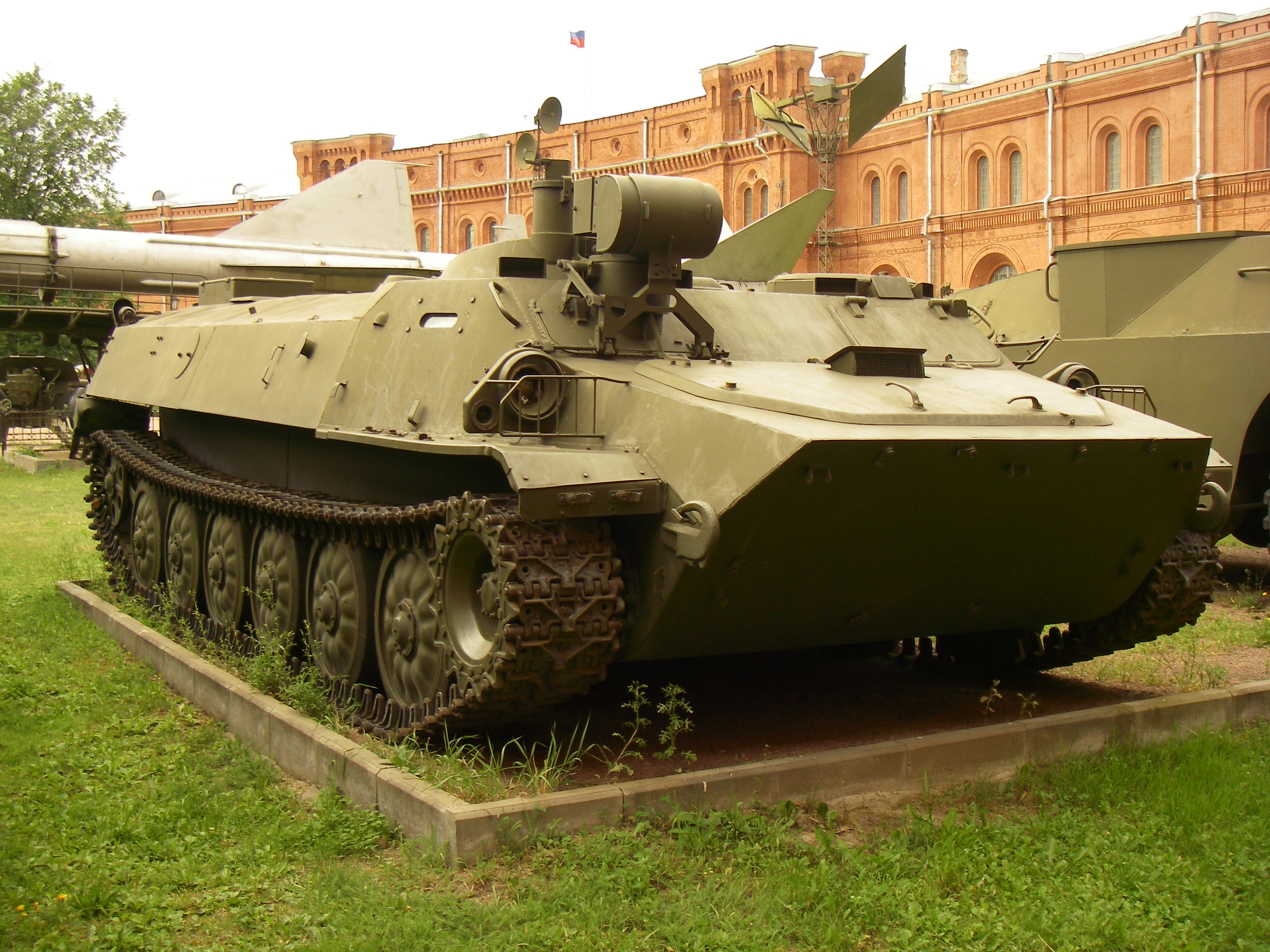
9P149 Shturm-S in Saint Petersburg Artillery Museum

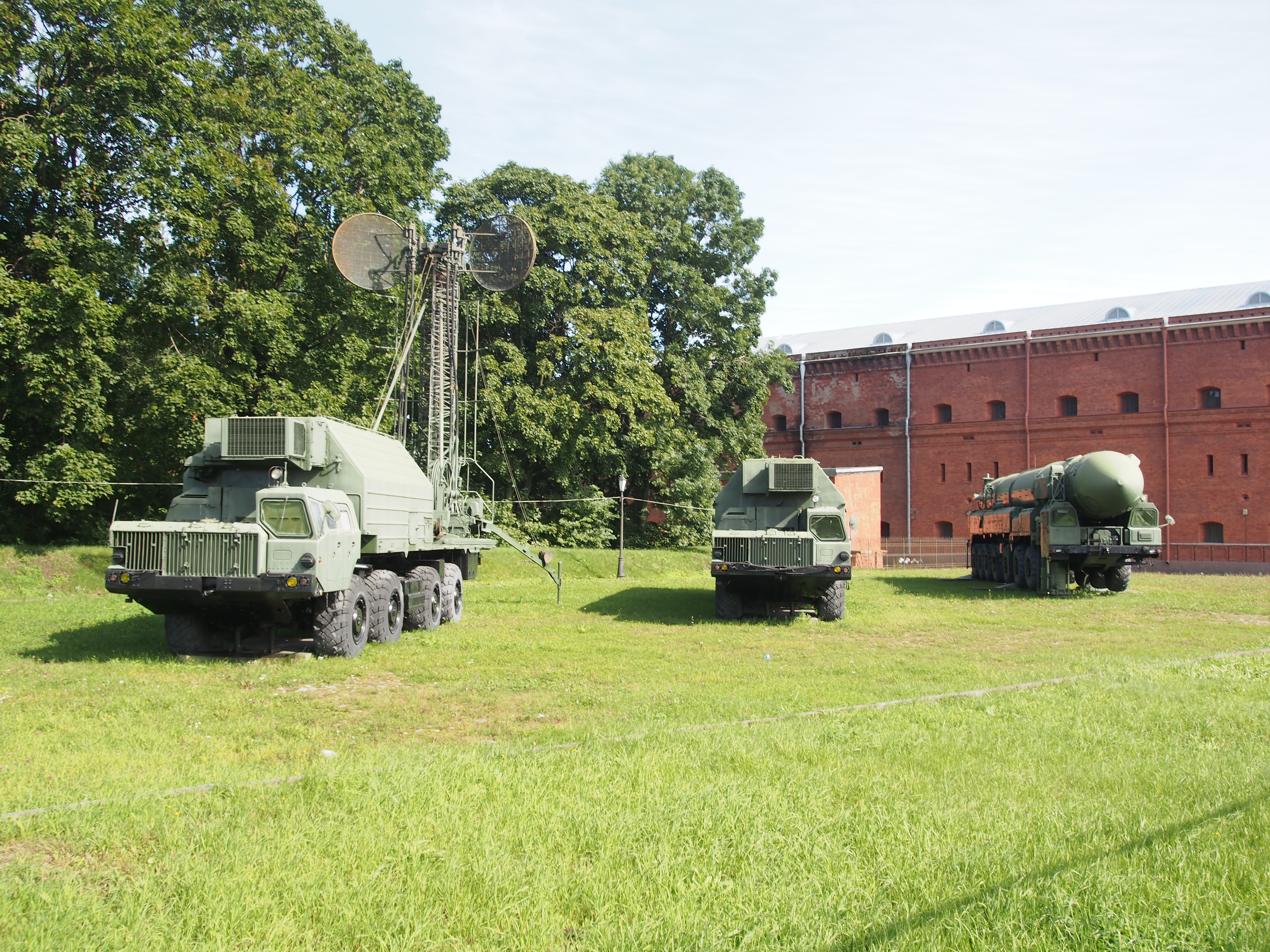
15V75 signal vehicle, 15V148 command vehicle and 15U168 Topol ICBM launcher

The Military Historical Museum of Artillery, Engineers and Signal Corps (Russian: Военно-исторический музей артиллерии, инженерных войск и войск связи), also known simply as the Artillery Museum, is a state-owned military museum in Saint Petersburg, Russia. Its collections – consisting of Russian military equipment, uniforms and decorations – are hosted in the Kronverk (a crownwork of the Peter and Paul Fortress) situated on the right bank of the Neva near Alexander Park. The museum is managed by the Russian Ministry of Defence.

== Location ==
The museum is located on the southern shore of Petrogradsky Island, directly across the Kronverkskiy Strait from the Peter and Paul Fortress.

== Exhibits ==
Among the exhibits are:

- Cannons made by Andrei Chokhov – the maker of the Czar Cannon
- An official chariot used for transportation of the artillery banner in the middle of the 18th century
- The cannons from "the entertainment regiments" of Peter the Great
- Personal arms, medals, and gifts received by Russian emperors and military commanders
- Trophy arms
- The famous Katyusha rocket launcher of World War II
- A room dedicated to the Kalashnikov AK-47 and its designer, Mikhail Kalashnikov.
- Array of Cold War era artillery pieces, anti-aircraft systems, armored vehicles, and missiles
