= Bolshoy Prospekt =

Bolshoy Prospekt may refer to:

- Bolshoy Prospekt (Petrograd Side), Saint Petersburg, Russia
- Bolshoy Prospekt, Vasilyevsky Island, Saint Petersburg, Russia
