= Baltic House Festival Theatre =

Theatre in Saint Petersburg, Russia

Coordinates: 59.9557°N 30.3129°E

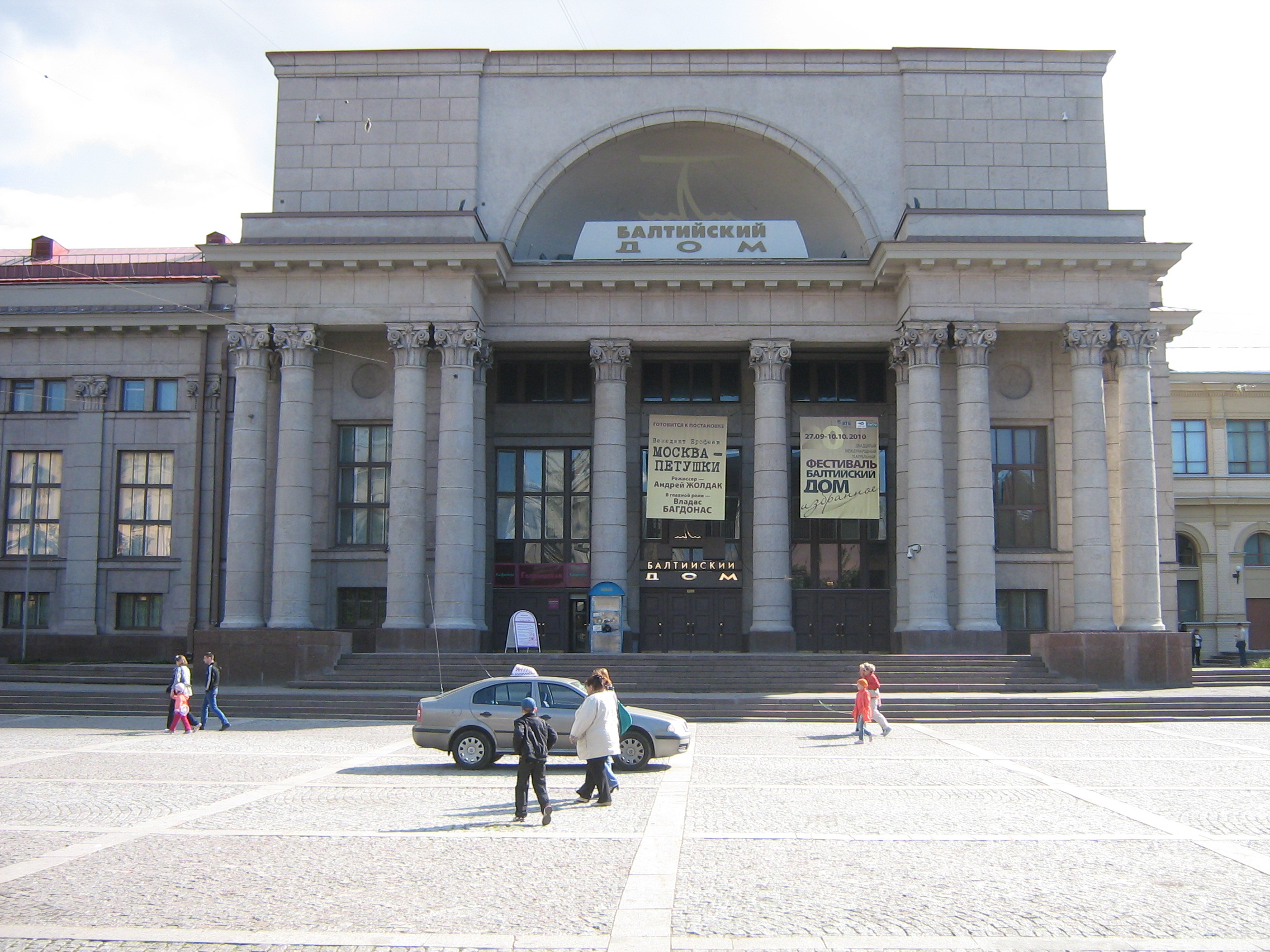
The Baltic House

The Baltic House Festival Theatre (Балтийский дом) is a theatre located in Alexander Park, Saint Petersburg, Russia, on Petrogradsky Island. It was founded in 1936 as the Lenin's Komsomol Theatre, and renamed Baltic House in 1991. From 1936 to 1939 it was located at 12 Vladimirsky Avenue, then moved to its current location in 1939.

Baltic House has been the main stage of the International Baltic House Theatre Festival (Театр-фестиваль «Балтийский дом») since 1991; the international festival of mono-performances, since 1997; and "Meetings in Russia", and the international festival of Russian theatres from Commonwealth of Independent States and Baltic States, since 1998.
