= Kamennoostrovsky Prospekt =

Street in Saint Petersburg, Russia

Coordinates: 59.9622°N 30.315°E

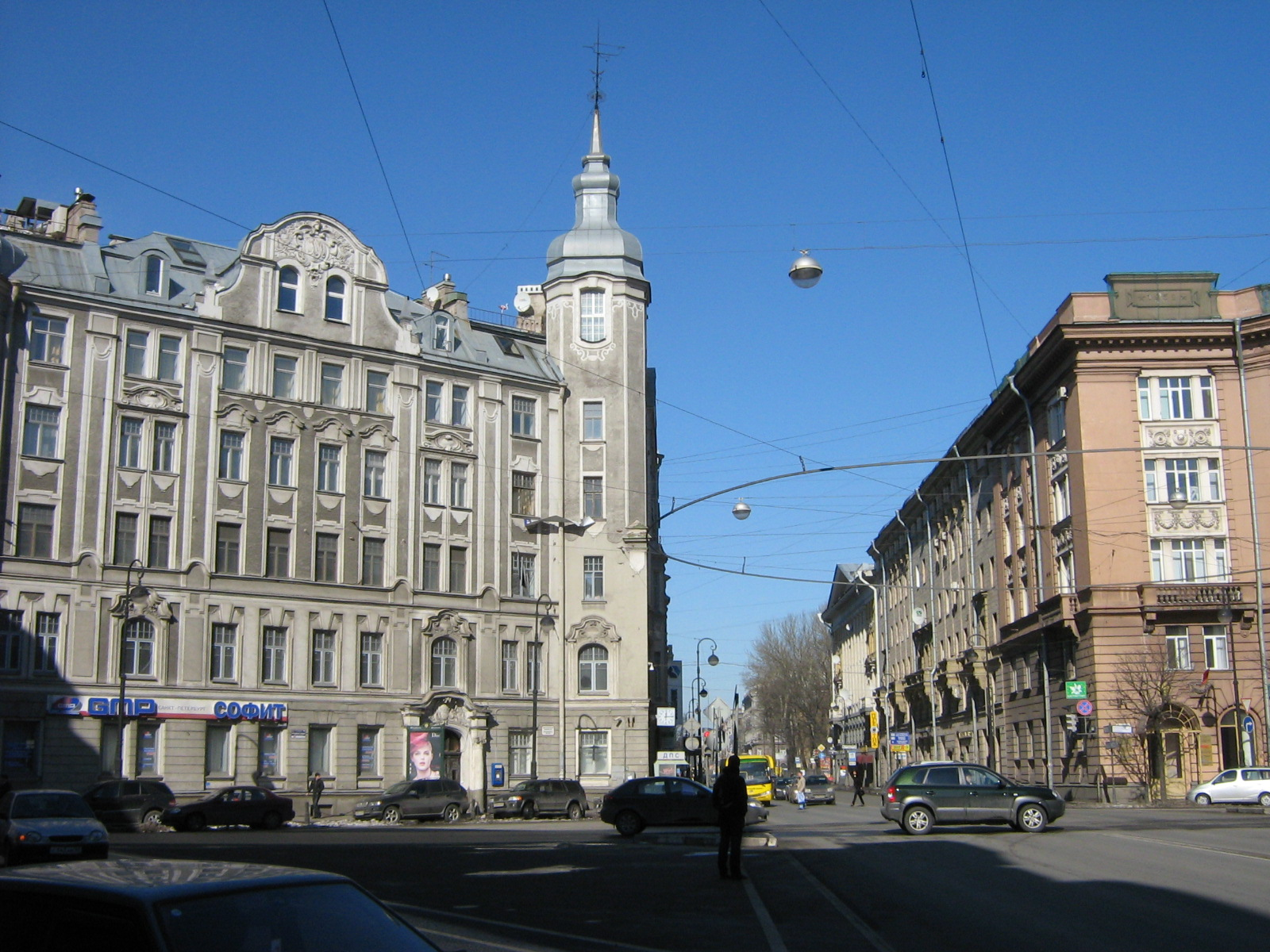

Kammennoostrovsky Prospekt (Russian: Каменноостро́вский проспе́кт) is one of the main streets of Petrogradsky District of Saint Petersburg. It runs from Trinity Bridge and Trinity Square across Petrogradsky Island, the Karpovka River, Aptekarsky Island, the Malaya Nevka and Kamenny Island to the Bolshaya Nevka. It is served by two Saint Petersburg Metro stations: Gorkovskaya and Petrogradskaya. At Leo Tolstoy Square, where the Petrogradskaya Metro is located, Kamennoostrovsky Prospekt crosses another large avenue, Bolshoy Prospekt. The section of Kamennoostrovsky Prospekt between Trinity Square and the Malaya Nevka was named Red Dawns Street (улица Красных зорь) from 1918 to 1934 and Kirovsky Prospekt (Кировский проспект) after Sergey Kirov from 1934 to 1991.
