= Hornwork =

Fortification element

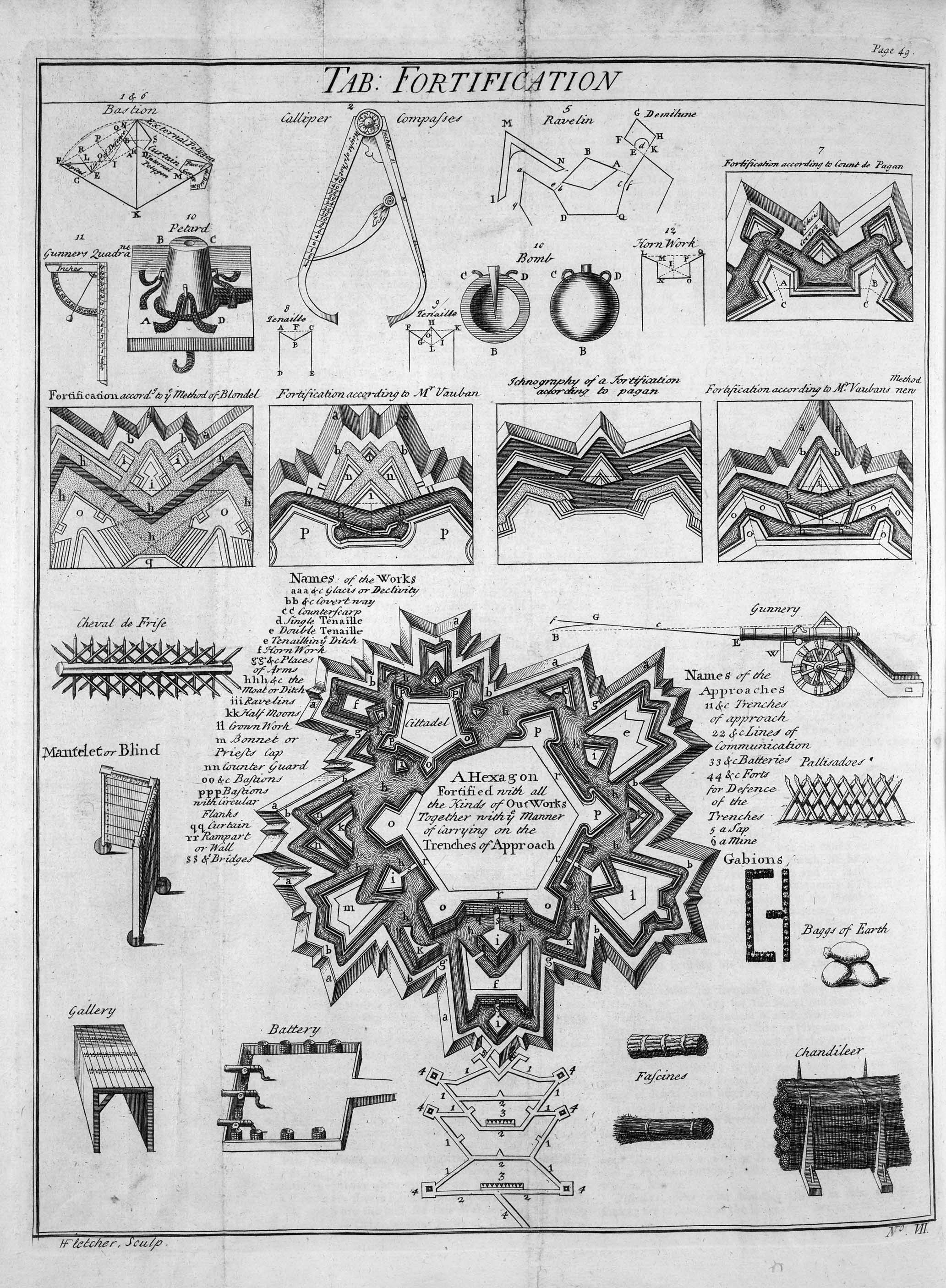
Feature 'f' is a hornwork

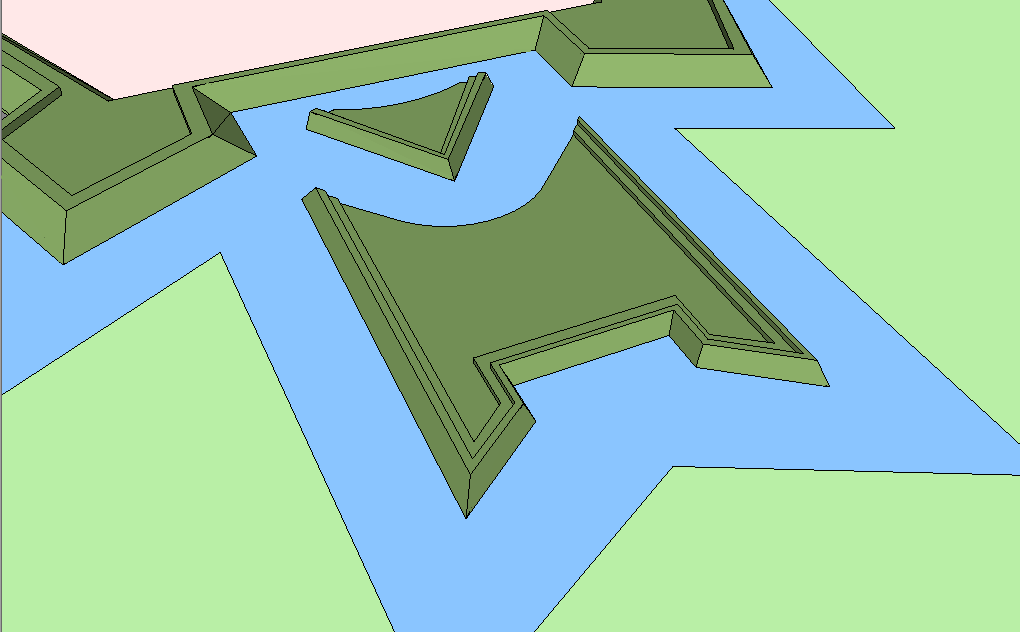
Hornwork

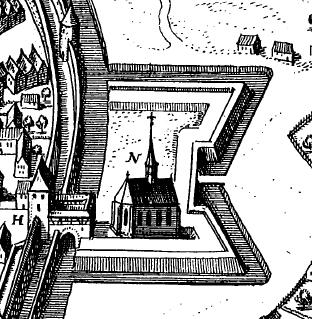
The Weber Church of Zittau inside a hornwork

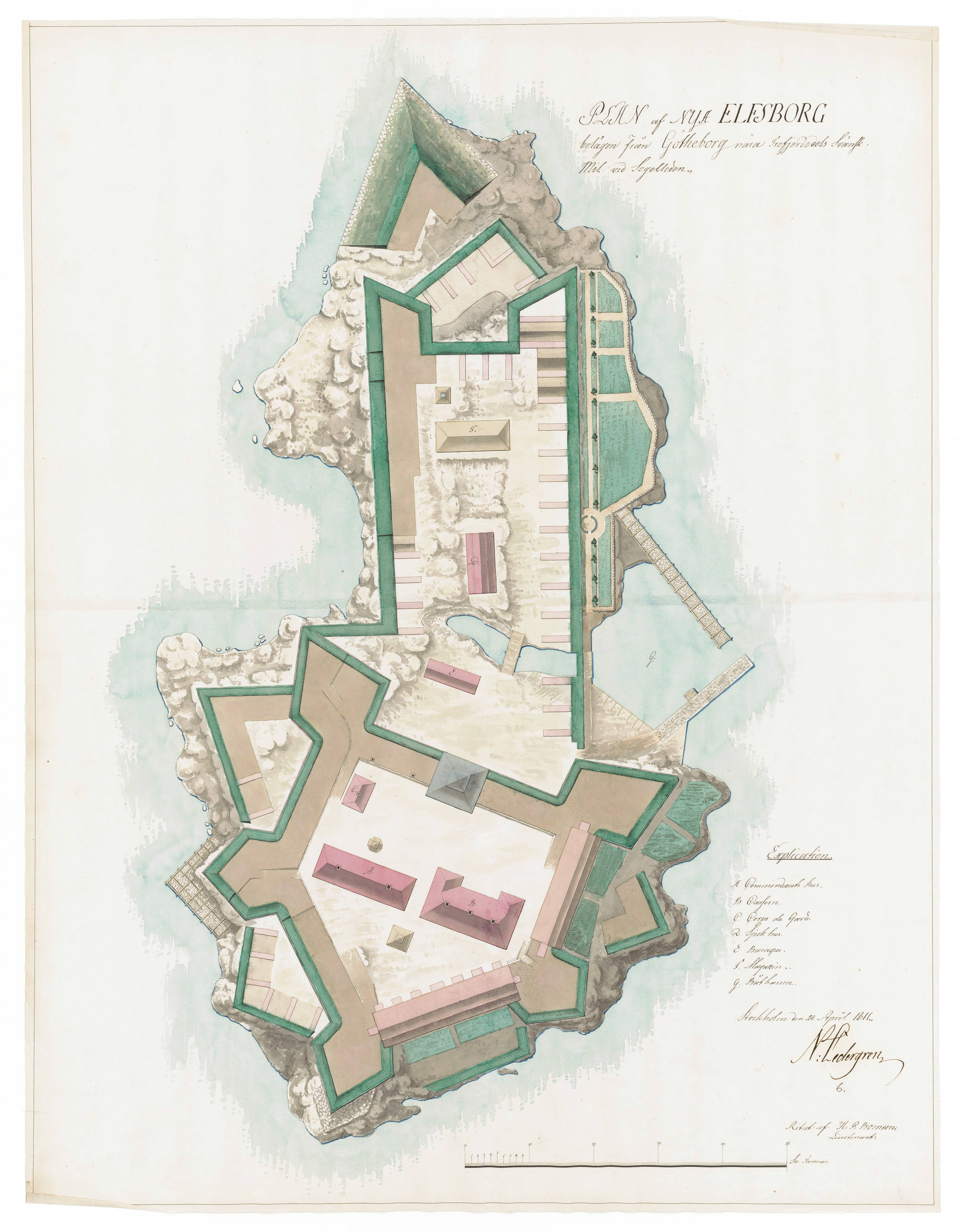
Drawing, showing a hornwork, of the fortress Nya Älvsborg in Gothenburg, Sweden from 1811.

A hornwork is an element of the Italian bastion system of fortification. Its face is flanked with a pair of half-bastions. It is distinguished from a crownwork, because crownworks contain full bastions at their centers. They are both outworks.
