= Crownwork =

Element of the trace italienne system of fortification

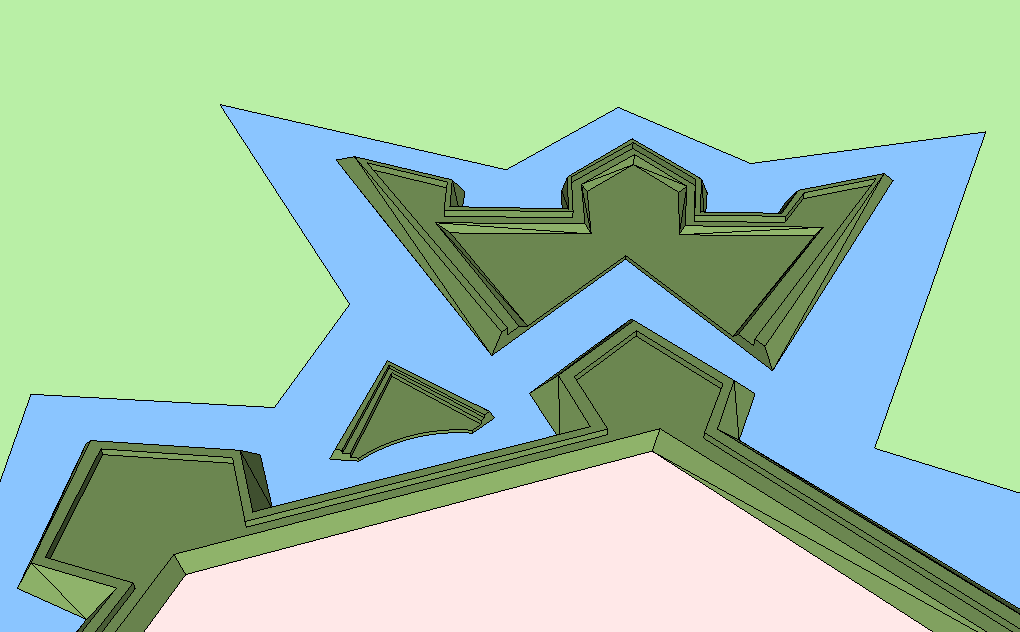
A crownwork outside a bastion

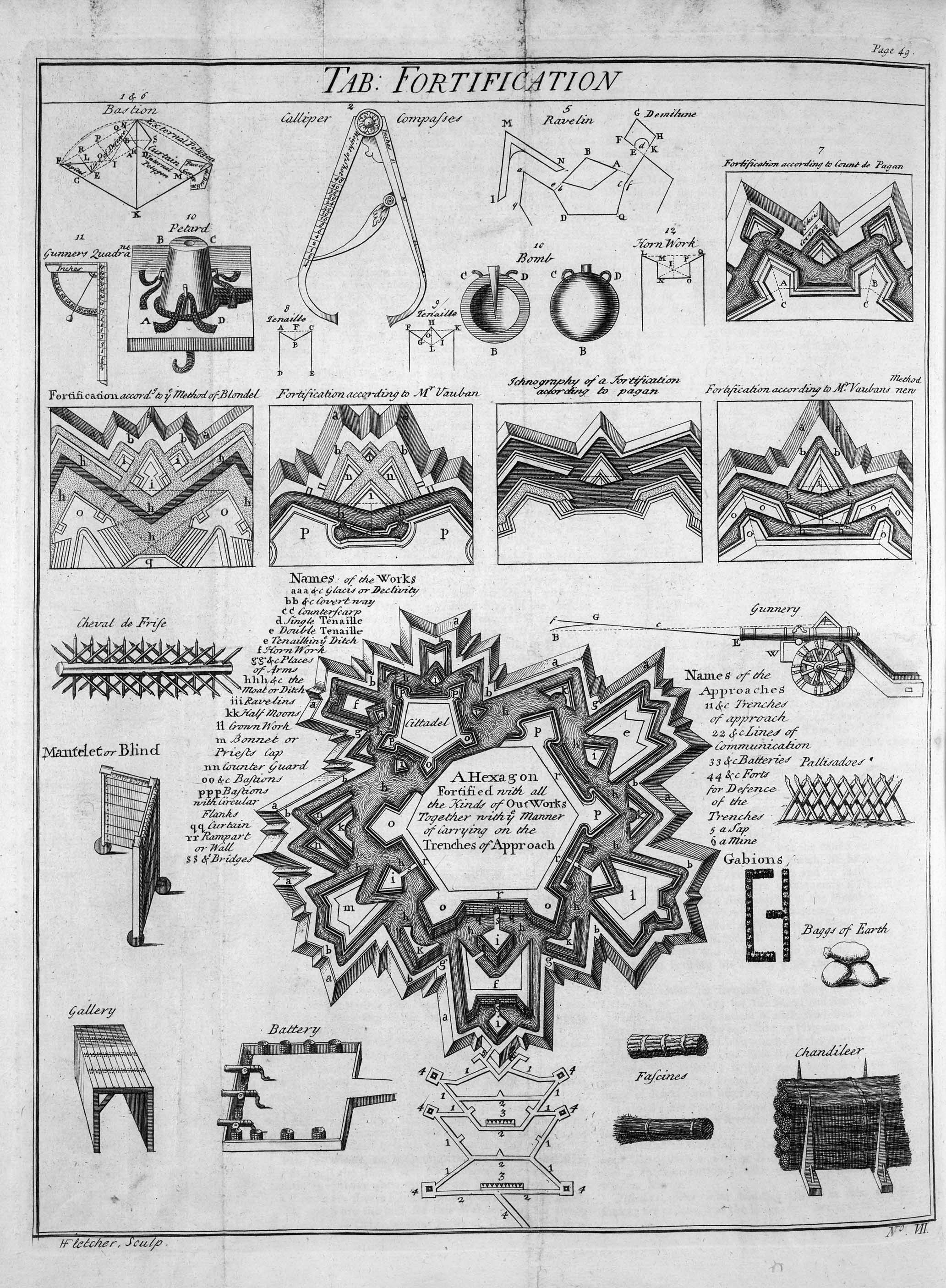
Feature 'l' is a crownwork.

A crownwork is an element of the trace italienne system of fortification and is effectively an expanded hornwork (a type of outwork). It consists of a full bastion with the walls on either side ending in half bastions from which longer flank walls run back towards the main fortress.

The crownwork was used to extend the fortified area in a particular direction, often in order to defend a bridge, prevent the enemy occupying an area of high ground, or simply strengthen the overall fortifications in the expected direction of attack.

== See also ==
- The Kronverk, St Petersburg, Russia
