= Bolshoy Prospekt (Petrograd Side) =

Street in St. Petersburg, Russia

Coordinates: 59.96°N 30.3026°E

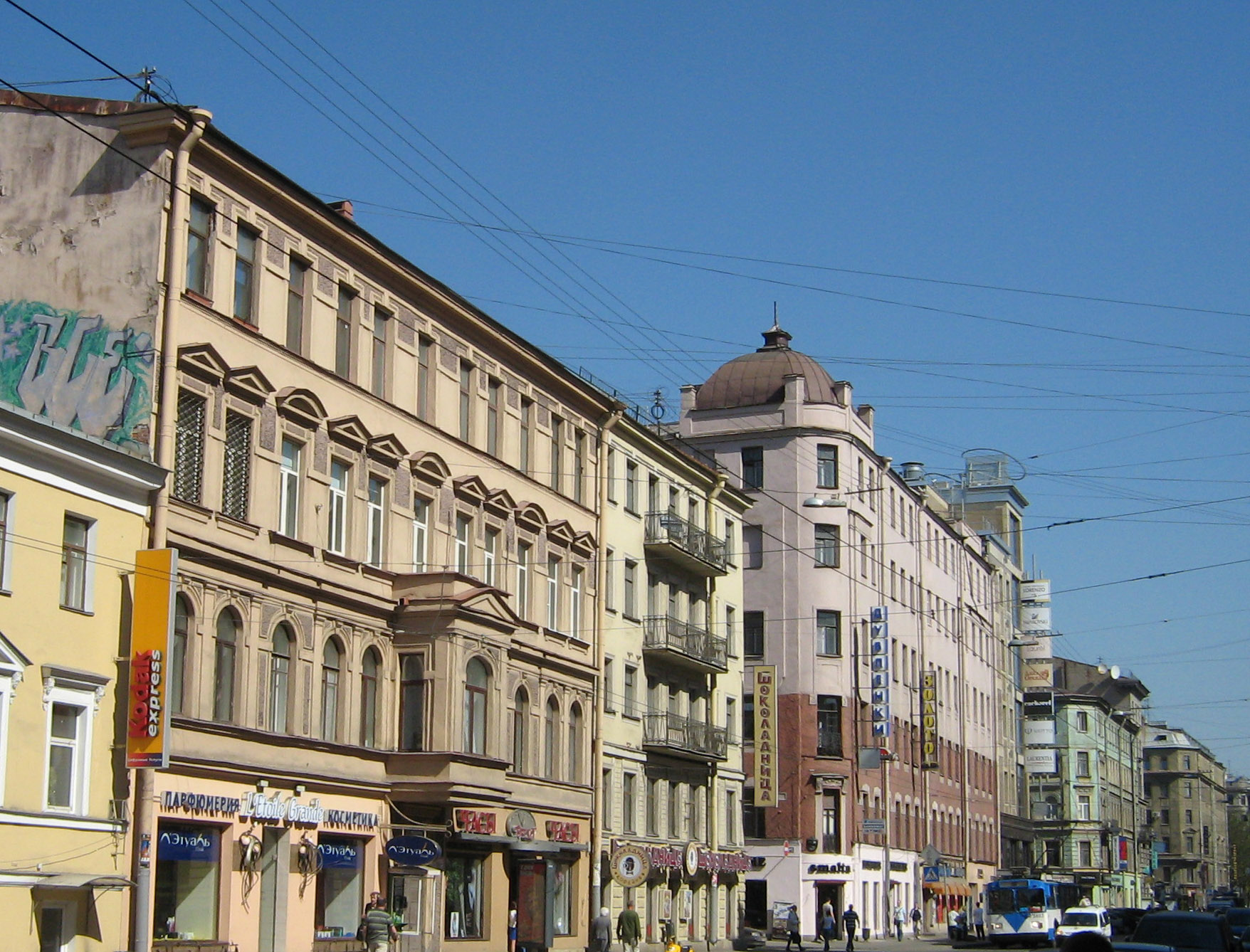

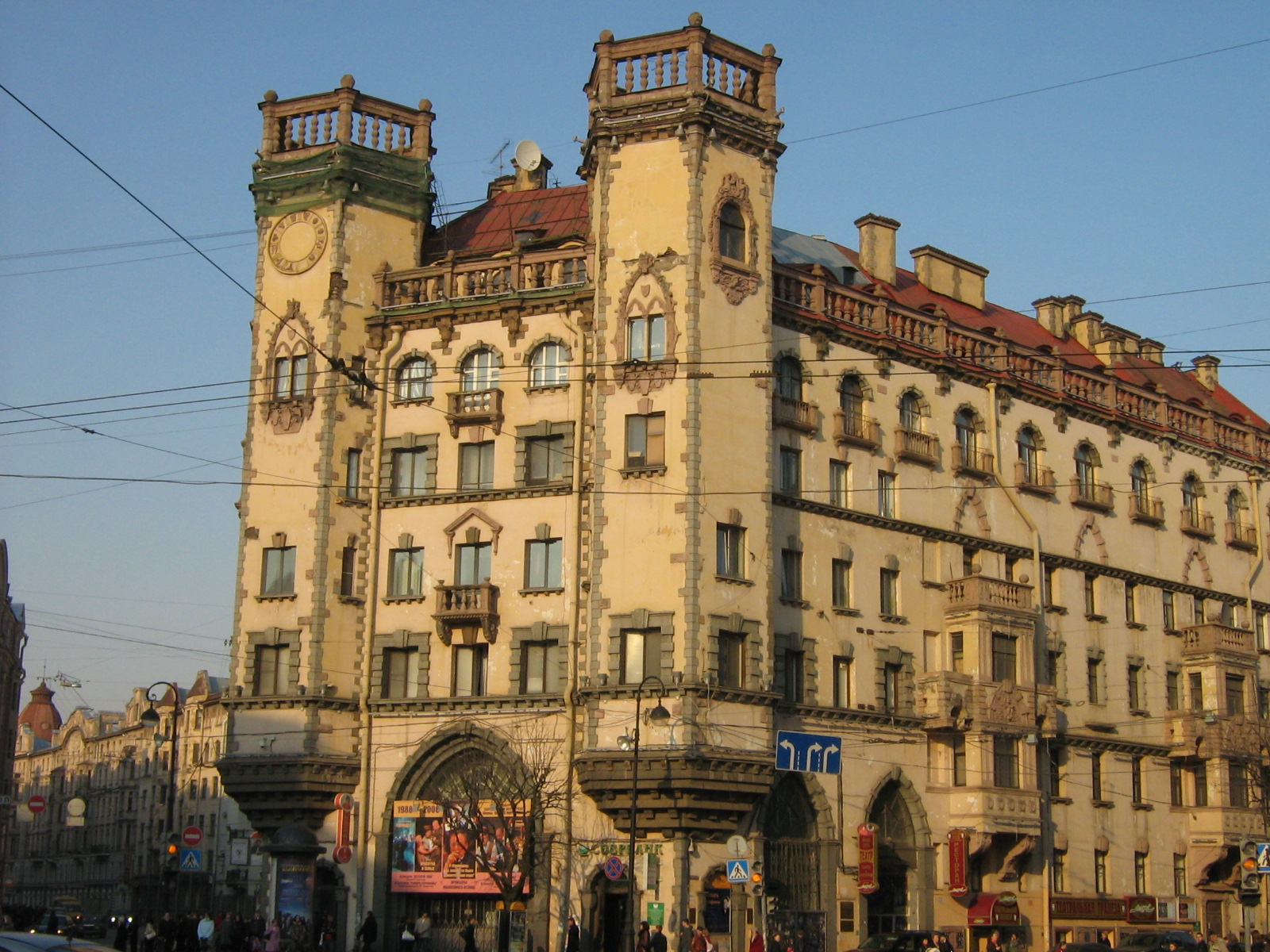

Bolshoy Prospekt of Petrograd Side (Russian: Большой проспект Петроградской стороны) is a large avenue in Petrogradsky District of Saint Petersburg, Russia, crossing Petrogradsky Island and spanning from Tuchkov Bridge across the Malaya Neva to Petropavlovsky Bridge across the Karpovka River. In 1918–1944 the avenue was named Karl Liebknecht Prospekt (проспект Карла Либкнехта). The street is served by the stations Sportivnaya and Petrogradskaya of Saint Petersburg Metro. Not far from the Karpovka, at Leo Tolstoy Square, where Petrogradskaya is situated, Bolshoy Prospekt crosses another large avenue, Kamennoostrovsky Prospekt. While the rest of the road dates back to the 1730s, the short curved section of Bolshoy Prospekt between Kamennoostrovsky Prospekt and the Karpovka was constructed in 1910. After the Karpovka it turns into Prospekt Medikov. For most of its length, excluding the section between the Karpovka and Kamennoostrovsky Prospekt, Bolshoy Prospekt is a straight one-way street with south-west bound traffic heading towards Tuchkov Bridge. Bolshaya Pushkarskaya Street is used for traffic in the opposite direction.

The buildings along the street mostly dates back to the late 19th – early 20th century and are designed in the Art Nouveau, National Romantic and Neoclassical styles, as well as other revivals.
