= Kronverk =

Coordinates: 59.9540°N 30.3133°E

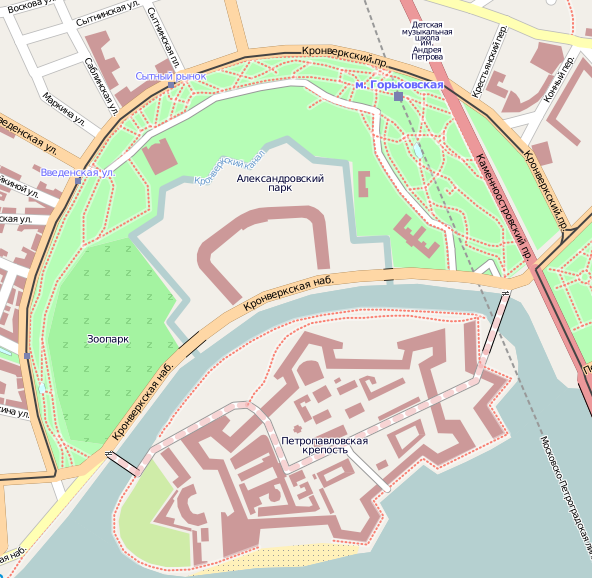
The Kronwerk is located north of the fortress island. The jagged blue line is a canal.

The Kronverk (Russian: Кронверк, from the German word for "crownwork") is a ground fortification for the Sts. Peter and Paul Fortress in Saint Petersburg, Russia. The Kronverk is situated on Petrogradsky Island, across the small island of the fortress proper (separated by the Kronverksky Strait). It was built in 1705–08, with reconstructions in 1752 and 1800.

Strictly speaking, it is on its own island: Artillery Island (Kronverksky Island), which is separated from the rest of Petrogradsky Island by the Kronverksky Canal.

On 13 July 1826, five participants of the Decembrists' conspiracy were hanged on the eastern rampart of the Kronverk (in 1975, an obelisk was installed on the supposed site of execution).

Today, it houses the Military Historical Museum of Artillery, Engineers and Signal Corps, which is also known as the Artillery Museum.
