= Hare Island (Saint Petersburg) =

Island in St. Petersburg, Russia

Coordinates: 59.950°N 30.315°E

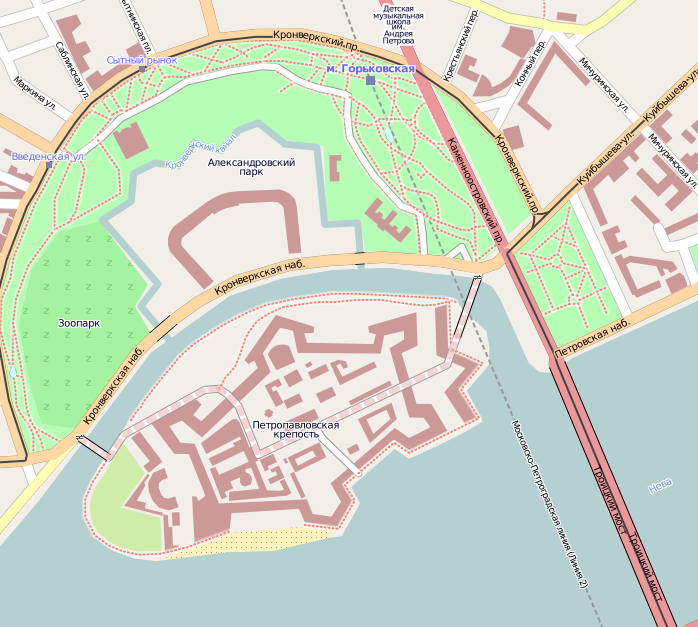
Zayachy Island

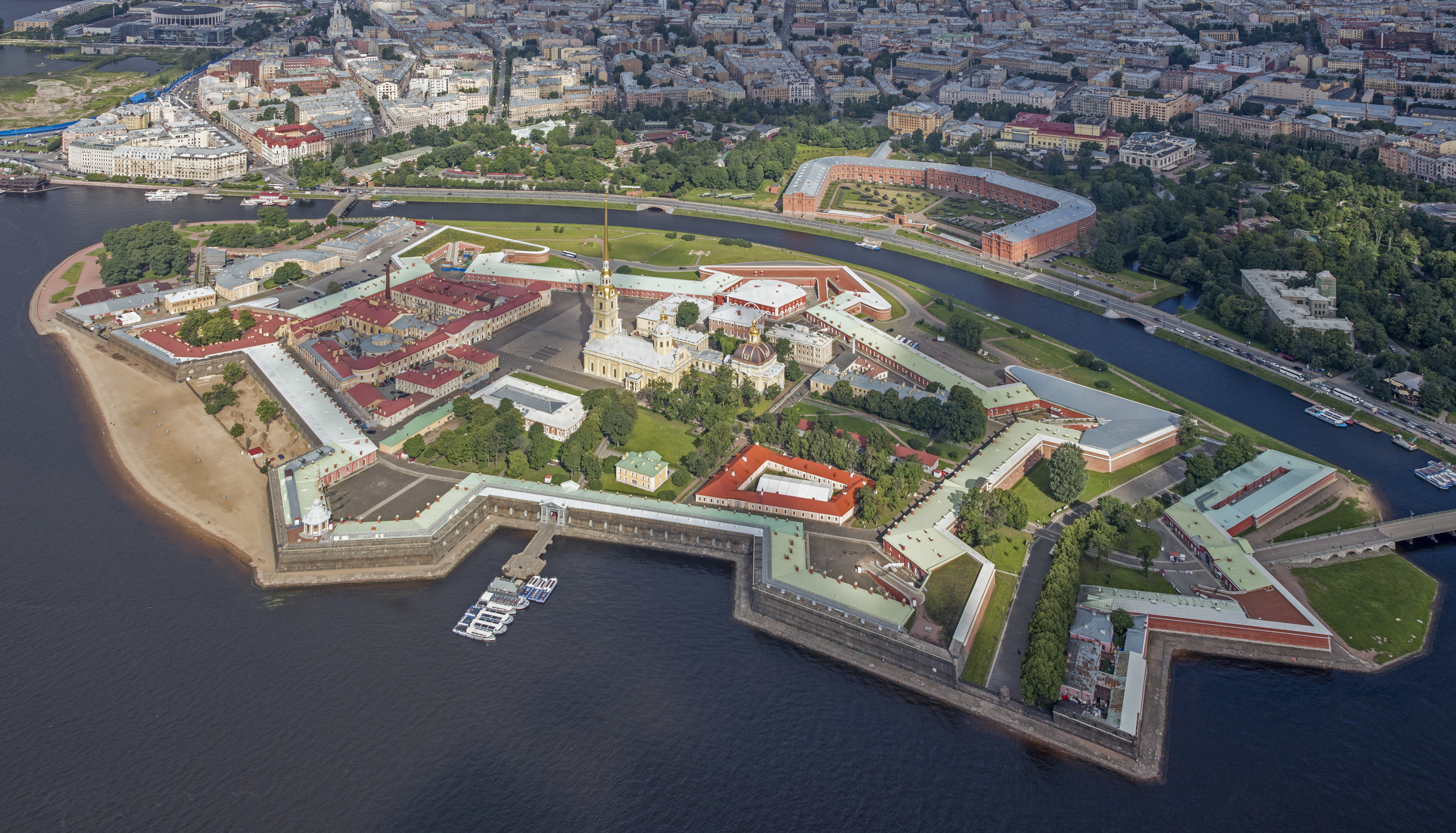
Aerial view of Zayachy island and the Peter and Paul Fortress

Zayachy Island (Russian Заячий остров, lit. 'Hare Island') is an island in the Neva River in St. Petersburg, Russia. It is separated by the Kronverksky Strait from Petrogradsky Island to the north, to which it is connected by the Kronverksky and Ioannovsky bridges.

== History ==
Zayachy Island was for the most part swampy, uninhabited, and unremarkable until 1703, when Peter the Great began the construction of the Peter and Paul fortress there, himself laying the foundation stones. Until the late 19th century, there were three canals inside the fortress, dividing the island into four parts. The canals were filled up by the late 19th century. The island is described as offering picturesque views of central St Petersburg (including the Winter Palace and Vasilyevsky Island) across the Neva River.

Zayachy Island is the site of Saints Peter and Paul Cathedral where many members of the House of Romanov are buried. On July 17, 1998, the remains of Czar Nicholas II and his family were buried there, eighty years to the day after they were murdered by the Bolsheviks.

=== Massacres ===
During the Red Terror, the island was the site of massacres of enemies of the state. Bodies were discovered during the building of a road linking a car park. Some estimates put the number of buried in the hundreds and potentially in the thousands. Human rights charity Memorial tried to convince the authorities to investigate the graves properly.
