= Petrogradsky Island =

Island in St Petersburg Russia

Coordinates: 59°57′45″N 30°18′08″E

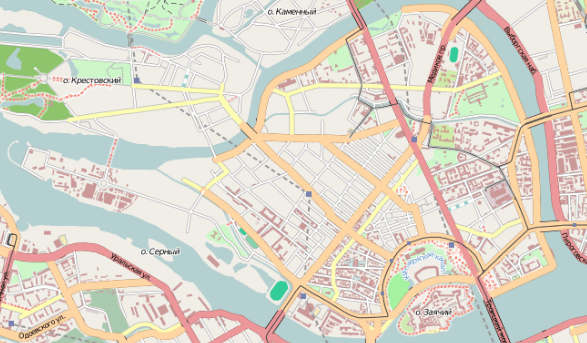
Petrogradsky Island

Petrogradsky Island or Petrograd Island (Russian: Петроградский остров) is the third-largest island in the Neva River delta in Saint Petersburg, Russia. Along with Zayachy Island, Aptekarsky Island, and Petrovsky Island, it constitutes the Petrogradskaya Side (Russian: Петроградская сторона). It is the administrative center of the Petrogradsky District and hosts a number of universities and research centers, as well as cultural, historical, and recreational facilities.

== Geography ==
Petrogradsky Island lies between the Neva River and its Bolshaya Nevka branch. It is separated from Aptekarsky Island on the north by the Karpovka River, from Krestovsky Island on the west by the Malaya Nevka, from Petrovsky Island on the south by the Zhdanovka River, and from Zayachy Island on the southeast by the Kronverksky Strait. It is linked to the central district by the Troitsky Bridge, to Vasilievsky Island by the Birzhevoy (Exchange) Bridge and Tuchkov Bridge), to Petrovsky Island by the Maly Petrovsky Bridge, to Krestovsky Island by the Lazarevsky Bolshoy Krestovsky Bridges, and to the Vyborgskaya Side via the Sampsonievsky and Grenadersky Bridges.

== History ==
Finnish and Swedish farms added to a large Russian settlement, continuing to develop the island in the 17th century. In 1703 Tsar Peter the Great of Russia laid the foundation of the Peter and Paul Fortress on nearby Zayachy Island. During this time, he resided near the present-day site of Troitsky Square near the southeastern tip of island. Its name was changing over the period and included Troitsky Island, Gorodovoy or Gorodskoy (City) Island and then was settled as St. Petersburg Island after the Peter's death. The administrative center of Saint Petersburg moved to Vasilievsky Island in the 1720s, and in the 1730s, stone buildings north of the Kronverk were banned. As a result, the island became more residential and suburban.

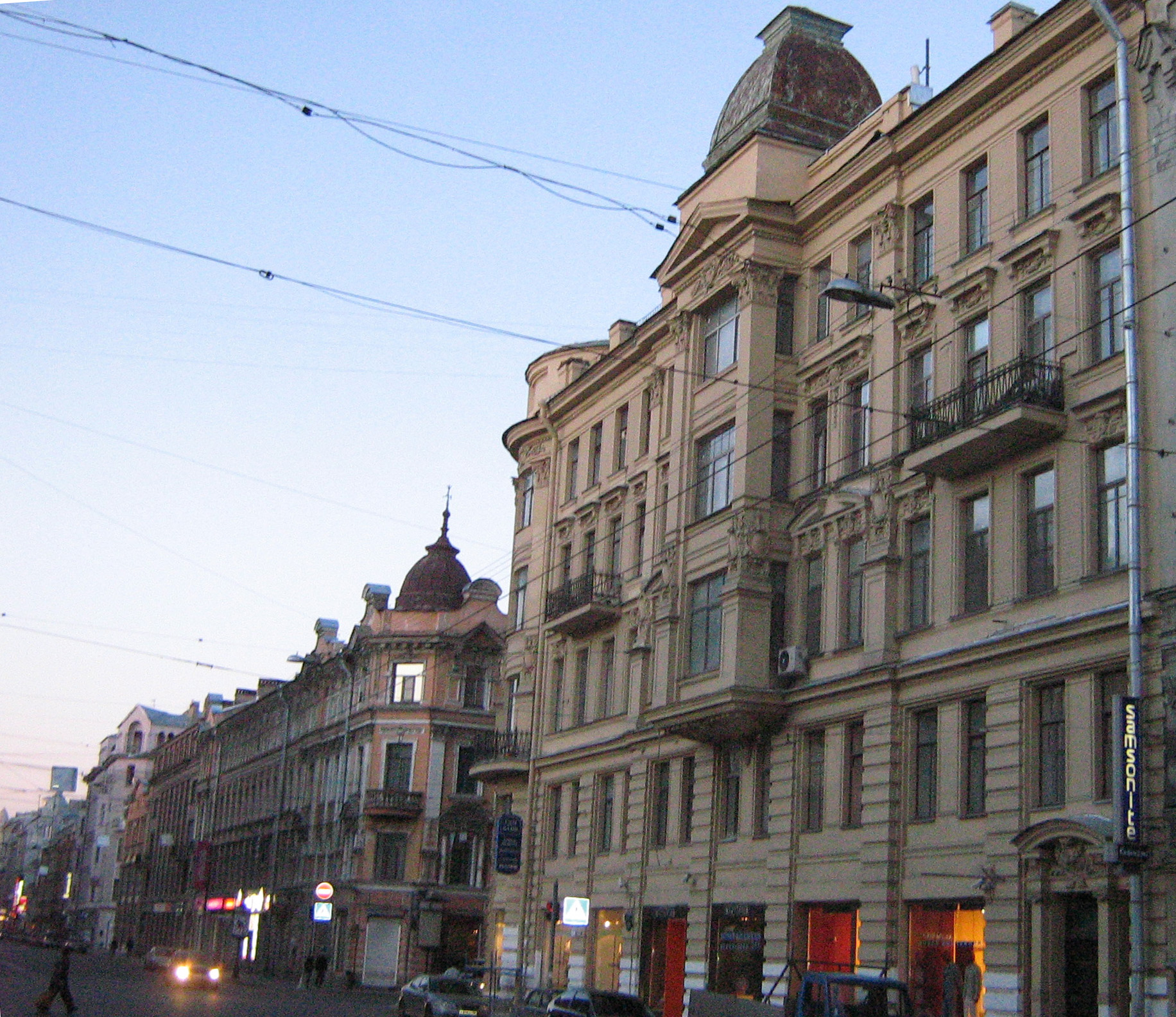
Bolshoy Prospekt

One of the earliest main avenues, dating from the 1730s, is the Bolshoy Prospekt, crossing the island from the northeast to the Tuchkov Bridge in the southwest. The Yamburgsky, Koporsky, St. Petersburg, and Belozersky regiments had their quarters on the island at that time, and the new road served to connect them all. Horsecars first ran in the 1860s, followed by trams in 1908 and trolleybuses in 1948.

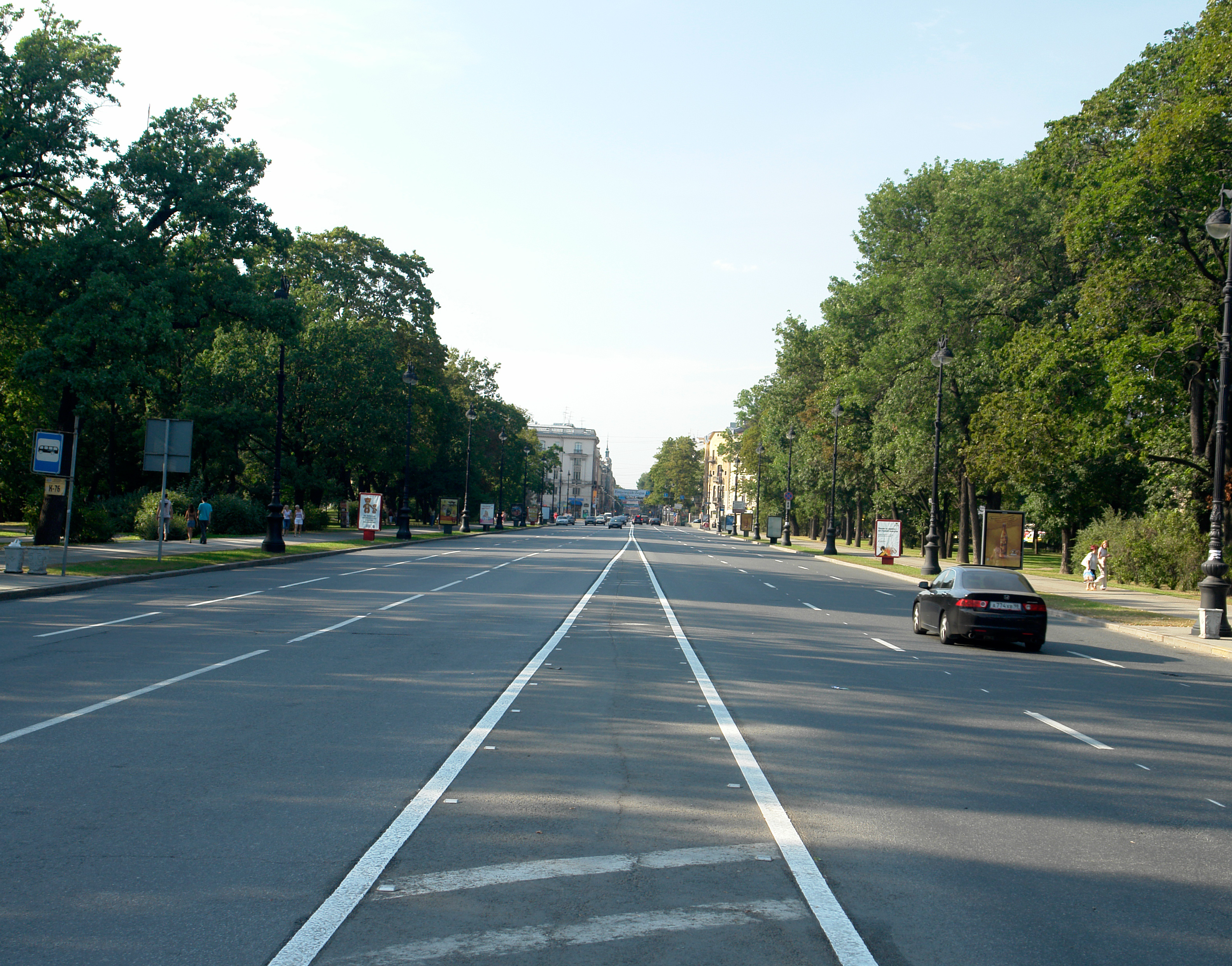
Kamennoostrovsky Prospekt

The other main avenue, the Kamennoostrovsky Prospekt, intersects the Bolshoy Prospekt in the north at Leo Tolstoy Square and runs southeast to the present-day Troitsky Bridge. The avenue was constructed in the 18th century, leading from the Kronverk esplanade to Kamenny Island. In the 1820s there was a high road with special paving. In the 1870s, horsecars started operating along the avenue, and in 1909, an electric tramway was introduced. In 1903 the avenue extended as far as Troitskaya Square.

When Saint Petersburg was renamed Petrograd in 1914, the island received its present name, Petrograd(sky) Island. However, when the city was renamed again–this time Leningrad after Lenin's death, the island name wasn't touched. Thus, when the original city name Saint Petersburg was restored, the name of the island remained intact and currently it is one of the few reminders of the days when the city was named Petrograd.

== Places of interest ==
Petrogradsky Island is the home of several noted universities, science and research institutes. The First Pavlov State Medical University of St. Petersburg, located at 6/8 Leo Tolstoy Street, was founded in 1897 as the first Russian medical institute for women.

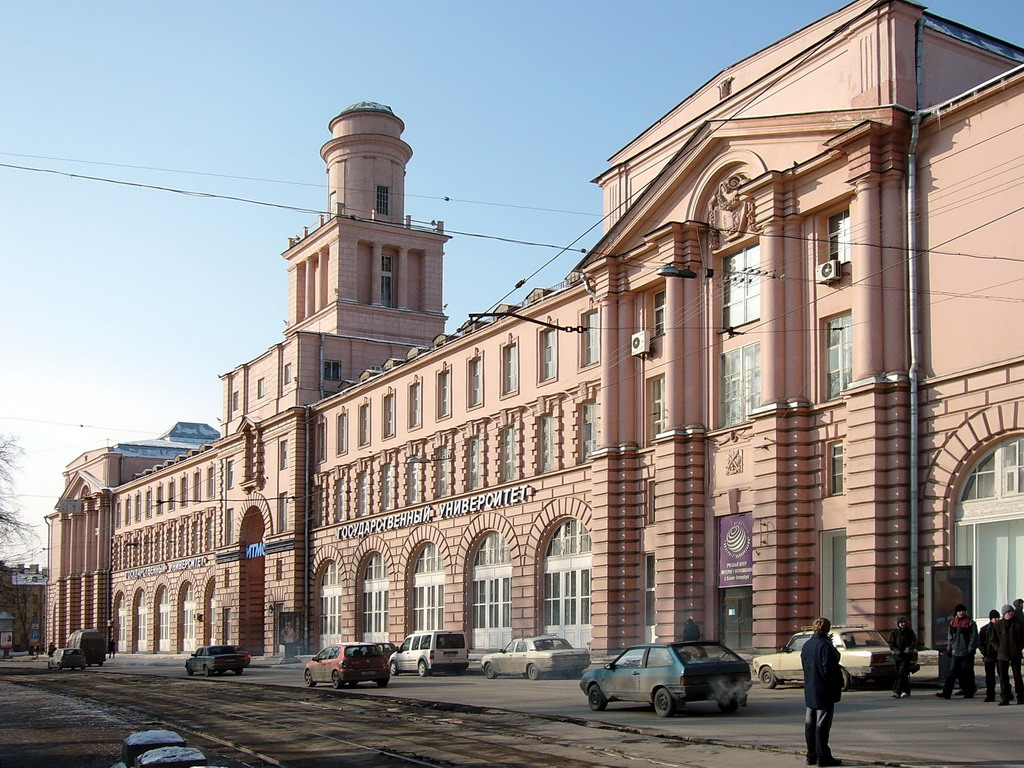
State University of Information Technologies, Mechanics and Optics

The Saint Petersburg State University of Information Technologies, Mechanics and Optics is one of Russia's leading technical universities. The A.F. Mozhaysky Military-Space Academy (13 Zhdanovskaya street) is a polytechnical military educational institution and space research center.

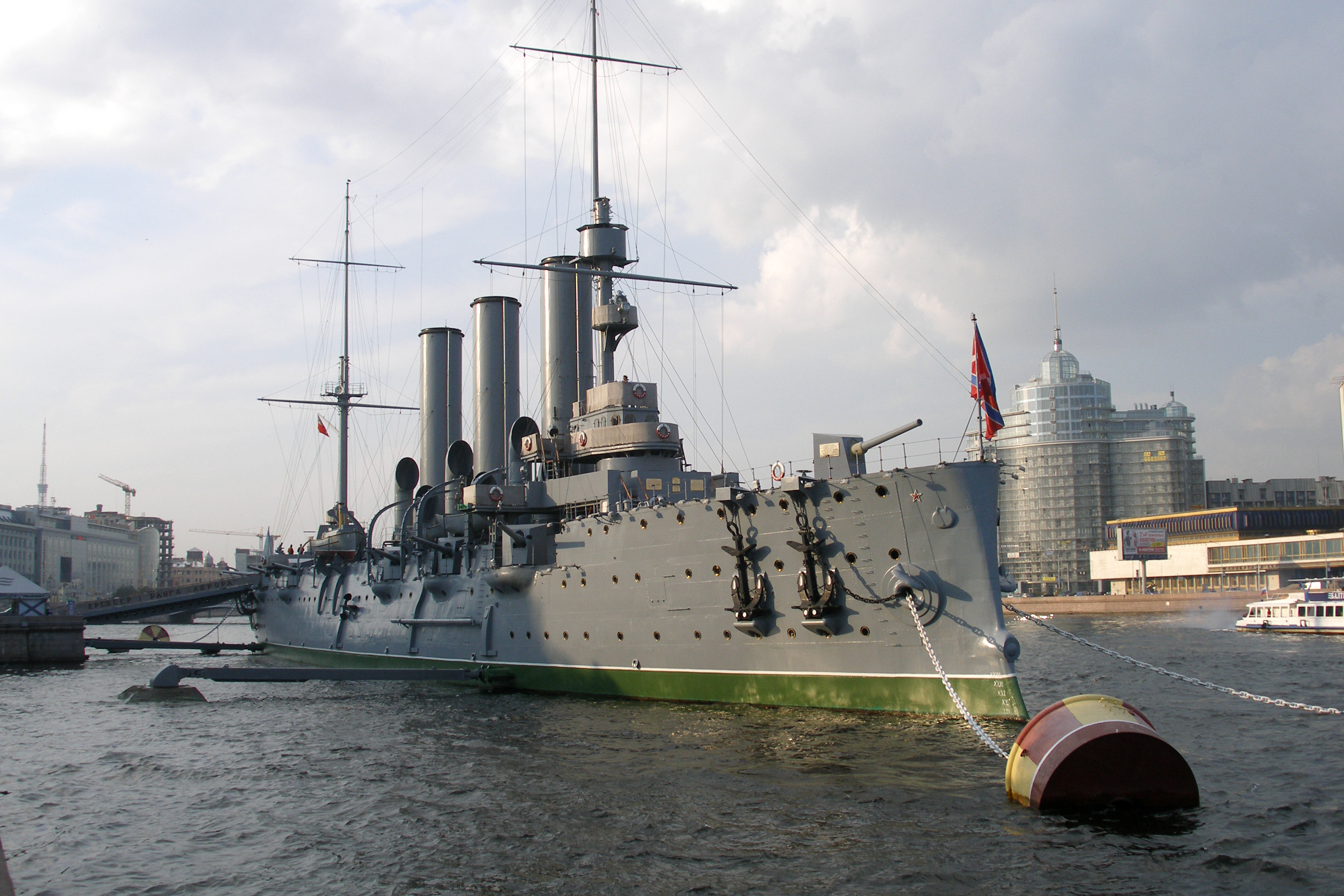
Cruiser Aurora.

Of historical interest is the cruiser Aurora, the oldest commissioned ship in the Russian Navy and a symbol of the October Revolution of 1917. A museum since 1956, it is anchored in the Bolshaya Nevka, near the Sampsonievsky Bridge. Just north of the Kronwerk, in the former Aquarium Gardens, the first motion picture was shown in Russia in 1896, at what is now Lenfilm Studios The island also houses the Baltic House Festival Theatre, the Yubileyny Sports Palace, the Saint Petersburg Planetarium and the Leningrad Zoo.
