= Peter and Paul Fortress =

Original citadel of Saint Petersburg, Russia

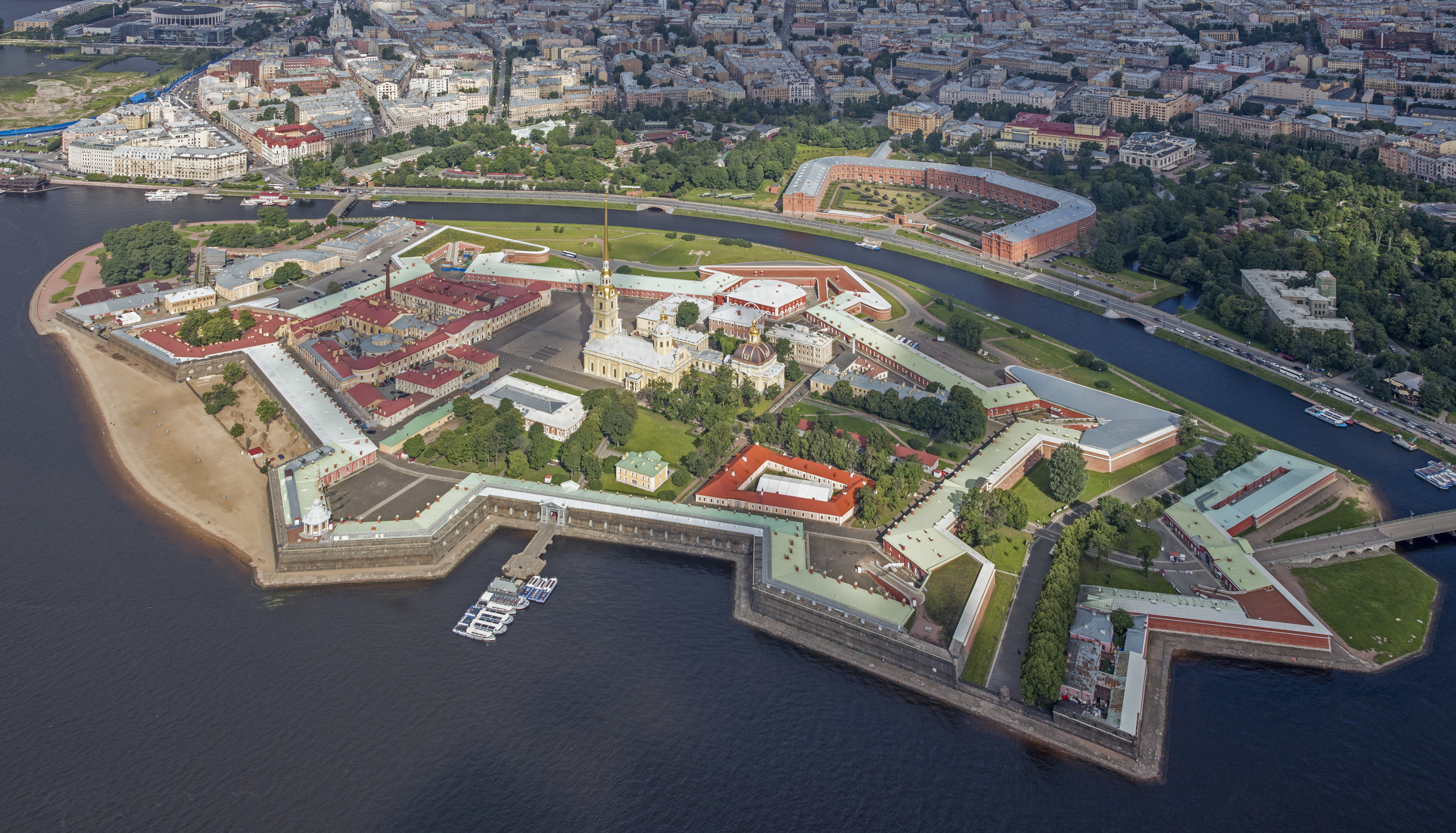
- An aerial view of the fortress

- Location within Central Saint Petersburg
- 59.950°N 30.317°E
- Type: Fortress and Museum
- Location: Saint Petersburg, Russia

History
- Built: 1703–1740

Site notes
- Architect: Domenico Trezzini

The Peter and Paul Fortress (Russian: Петропавловская крепость, romanized: Petropavlovskaya krepost') is the original citadel of Saint Petersburg, Russia, founded by Peter the Great in 1703 and built to Domenico Trezzini's designs from 1706 to 1740 as a star fortress. Between the first half of the 1700s and early 1920s it served as a prison for political criminals. It has been a museum since 1924.

== History ==
=== From foundation until 1917 ===
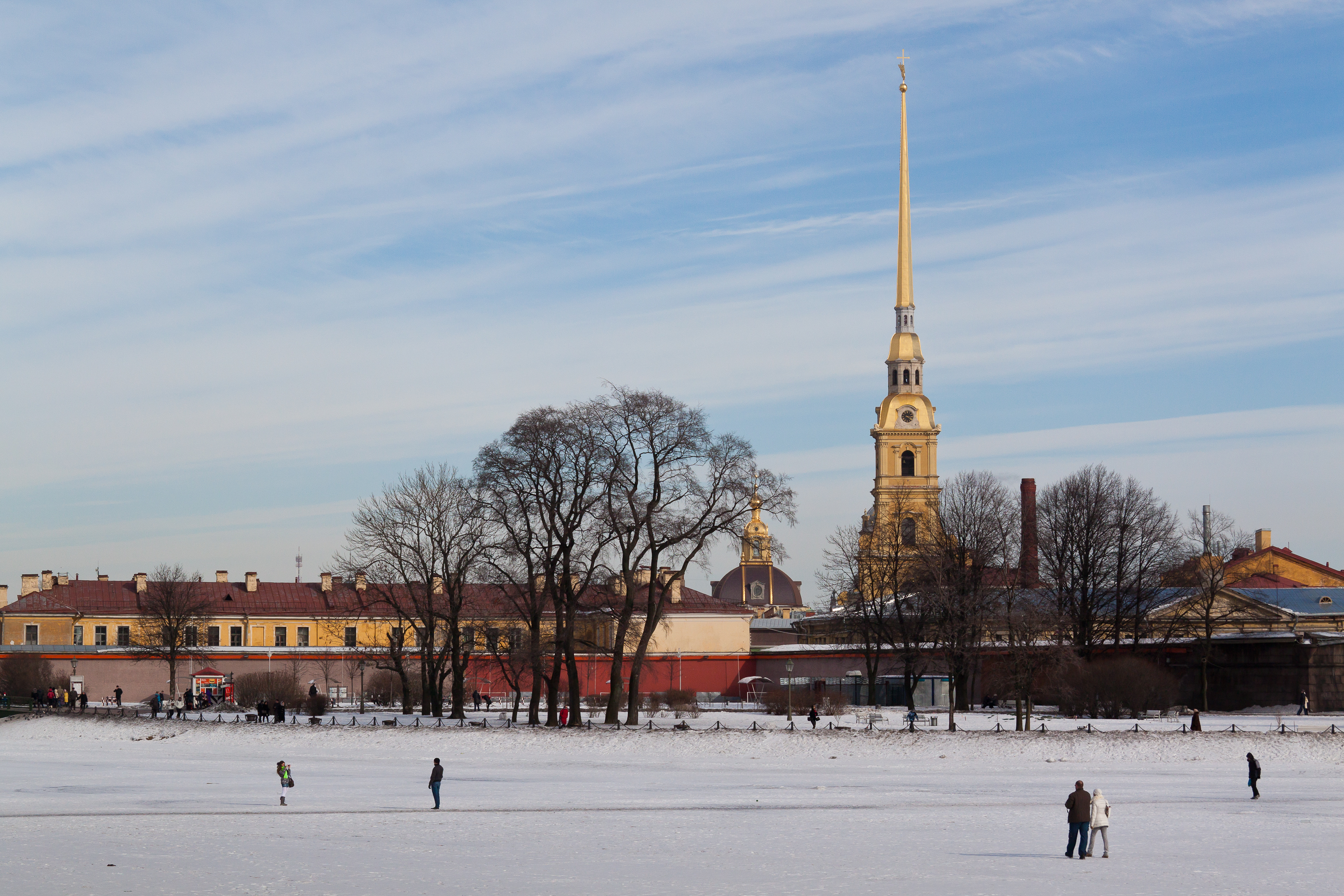
Peter and Paul Fortress

The fortress was established by Peter the Great on 27 May [O.S. 16 May] 1703, on small Hare Island by the north bank of the Neva River. From around 1720, the fort served as a base for the city garrison and also as a prison for high-ranking or political prisoners.

=== Russian Revolution and beyond ===
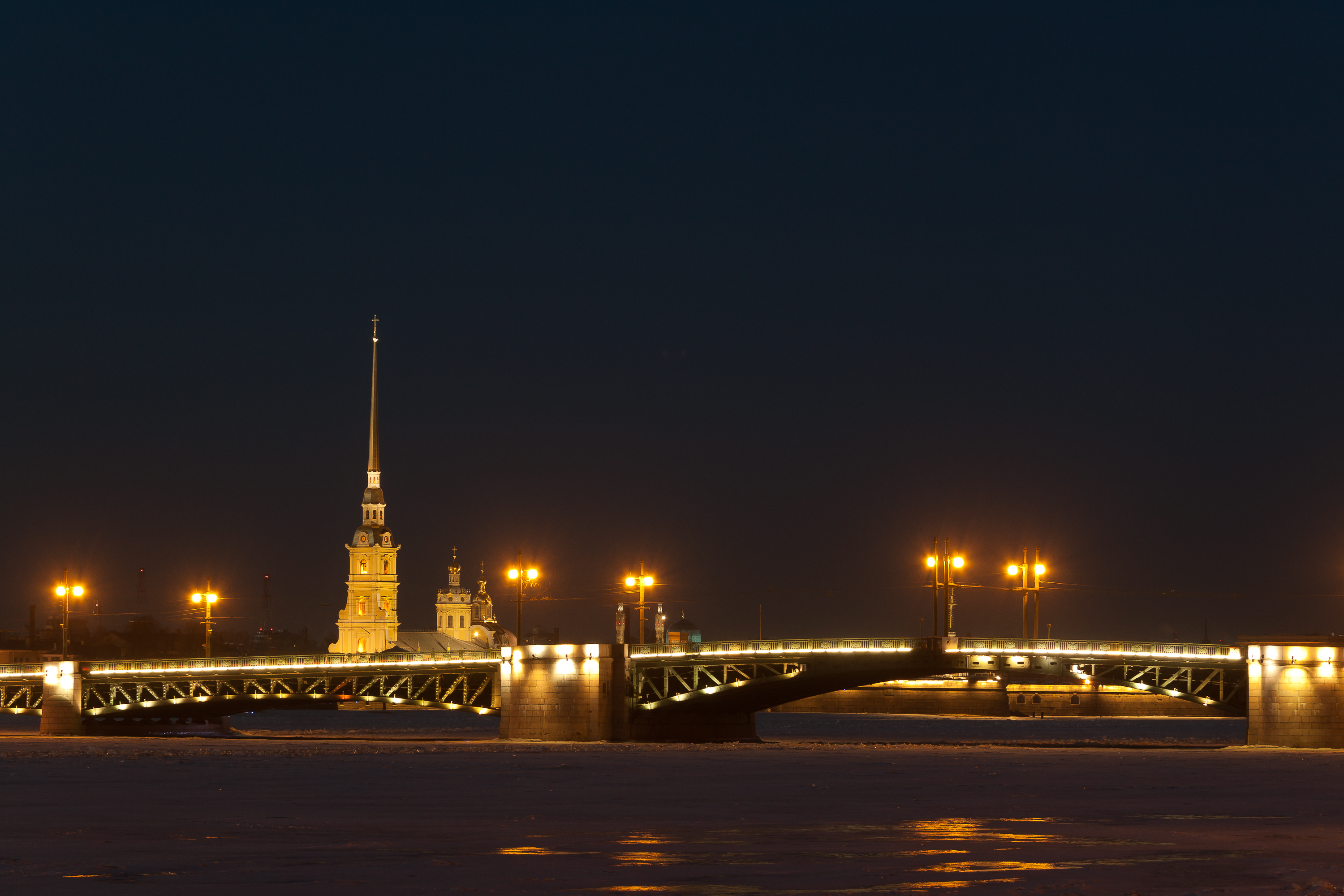
Palace Bridge and "Peter and Paul" fortress

During the February Revolution of 1917, it was attacked by mutinous soldiers of the Pavlovsky Life Guards Regiment on 27 February (O.S.) and the prisoners were freed. Under the Provisional Government, hundreds of Tsarist officials were held in the Fortress.

The tsar was threatened with being incarcerated at the fortress on his return from Mogilev to Tsarskoye Selo on 8 March (O.S.), but he was placed under house arrest. On 4 July (O.S.) during the July Days demonstrations, the fortress garrison of 8,000 men declared for the Bolsheviks. They surrendered to government forces without a struggle on 6 July (O.S.).

On 25 October (O.S.), the fortress quickly fell into Bolshevik hands. Following the ultimatum from the Petrograd Soviet to the Provisional Government ministers in the Winter Palace, after the blank salvo of the cruiser Aurora at 21:00, the guns of the fortress fired 30 or so shells at the Winter Palace. Just two hits, inflicting only minor damage, and the defenders refused to surrender at that time. At 02:10 on the morning of 26 October (O.S.), the Winter Palace was taken by forces under Vladimir Antonov-Ovseenko; the captured ministers were taken to the fortress as prisoners. On 28 January 1919, four grand dukes from the House of Romanov were shot within the walls of the fortress on the orders of the Presidium of the Cheka under Felix Dzerzhinsky, Yakov Peters, Martin Latsis, and Ivan Ksenofontov.

The structure suffered heavy damage during the bombardment of the city during World War II by the Luftwaffe who were laying siege to the city. It has been restored post-war and is a tourist attraction.

== Sights ==
The fortress contains several buildings clustered around the Peter and Paul Cathedral (1712–1733), which has a 122.5 m (402 ft) bell-tower and a gilded angel-topped cupola.

Other structures inside the fortress include the still functioning Saint Petersburg Mint building (constructed to Antonio Porta's designs under Emperor Paul I), the Trubetskoy Bastion with its grim prison cells, and the city museum.

Views of the fortress

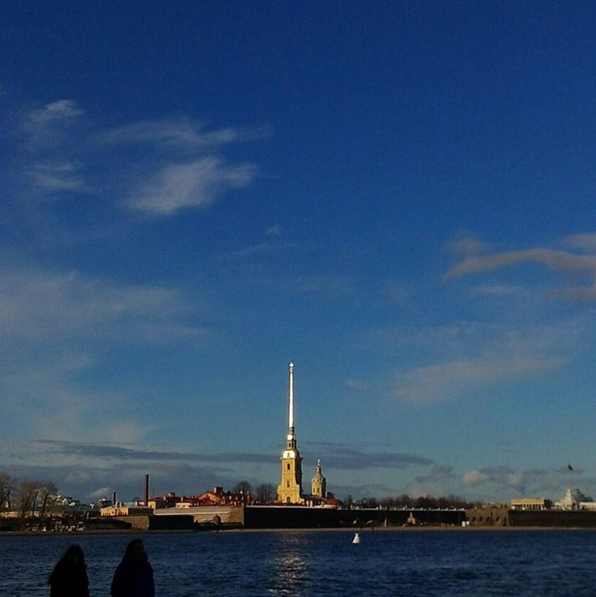
Peter and Paul Fortress. View across the Neva River

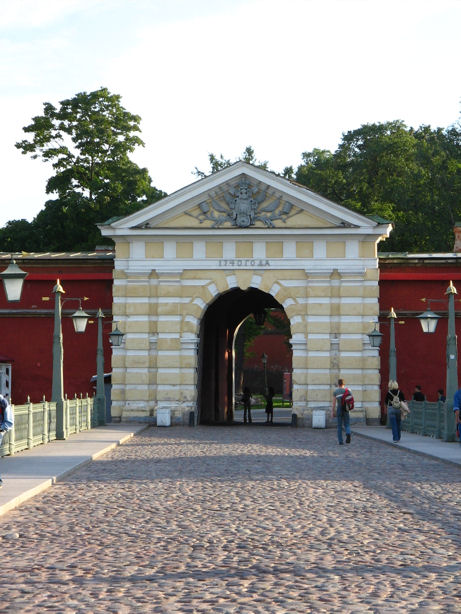
Entrance from Ioannovsky Bridge

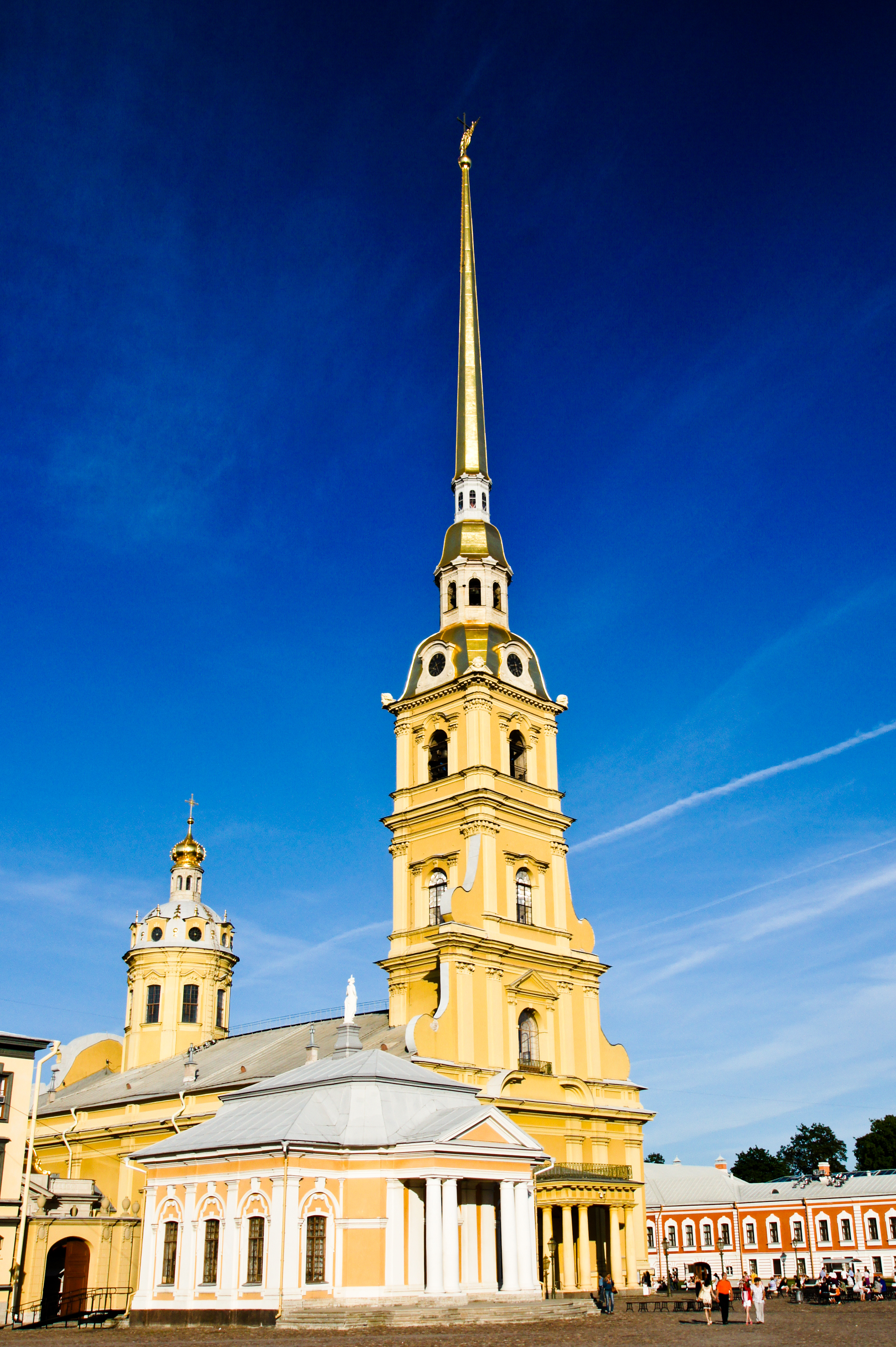
Saints Peter and Paul Cathedral, Saint Petersburg

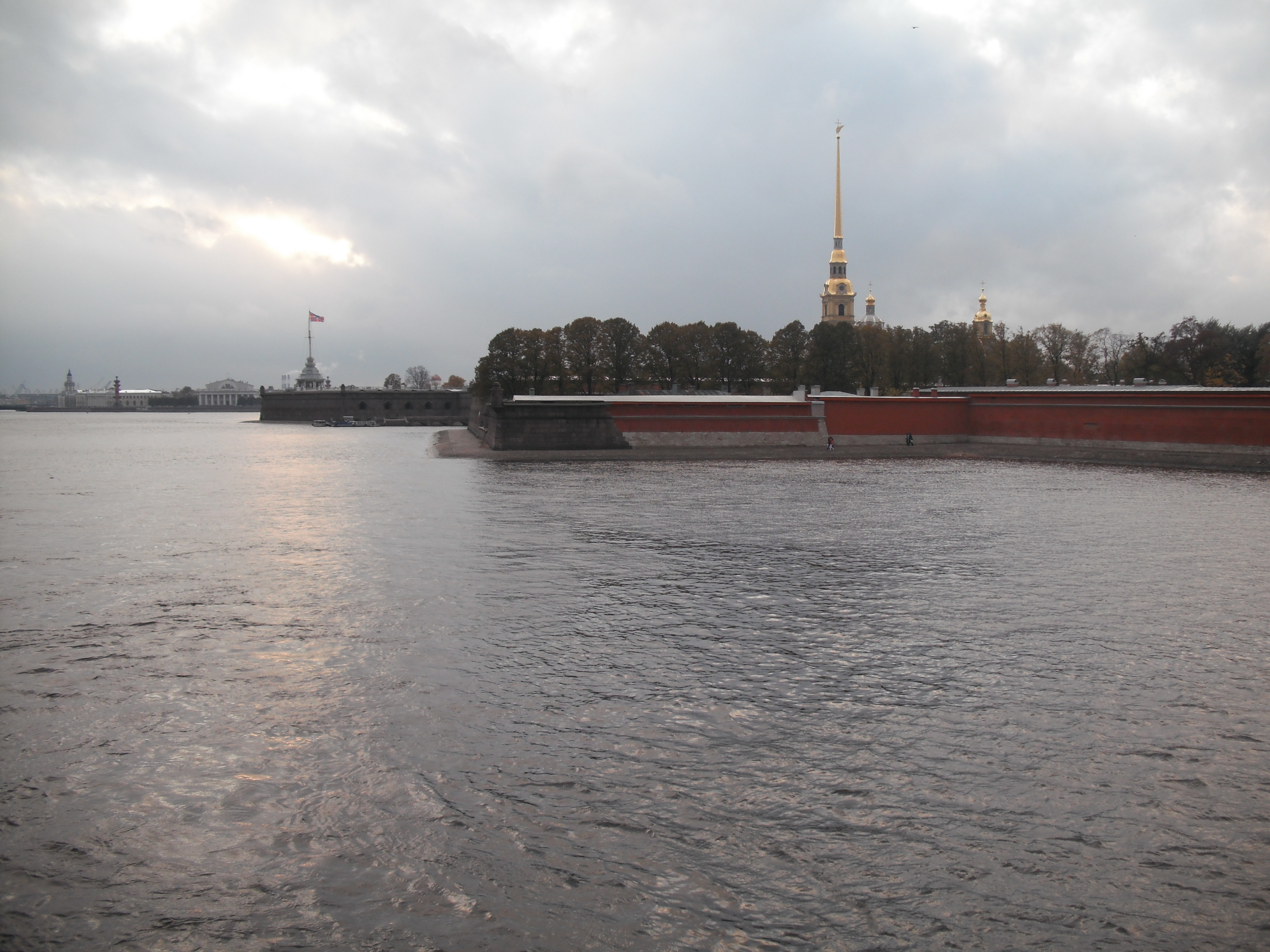
View of the fortress and cathedral from the Neva

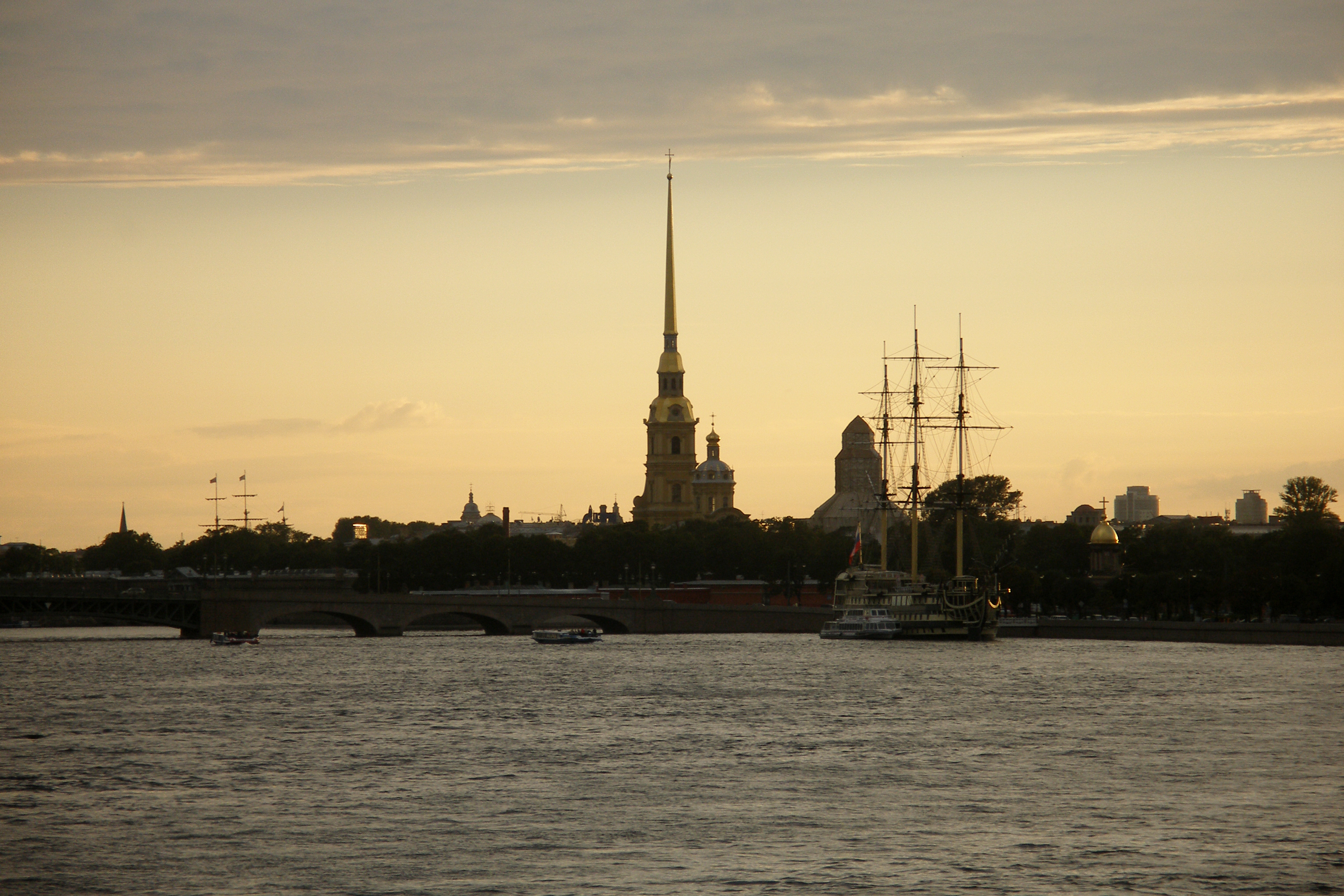
Peter and Paul Fortress at sunset

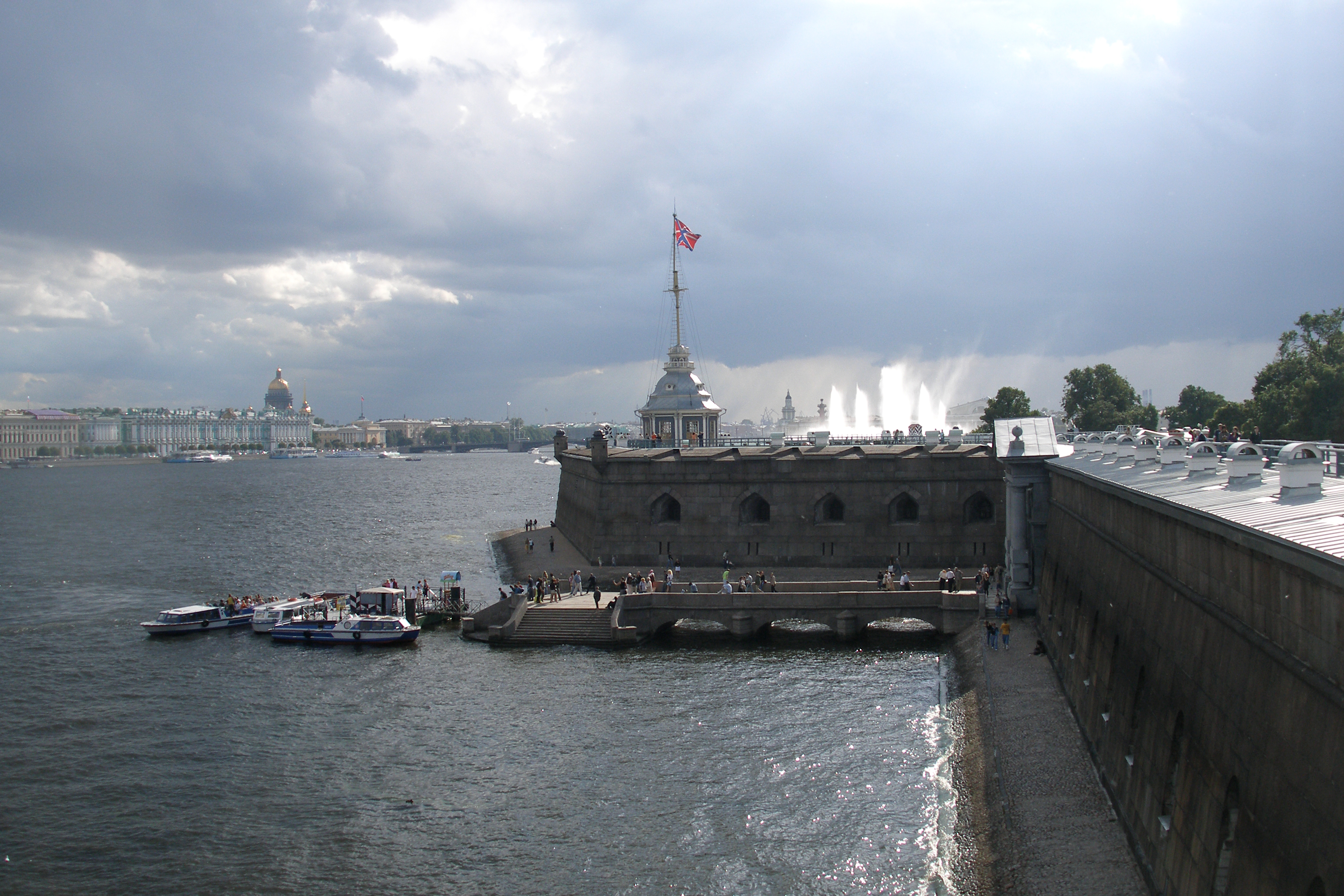
Walls

To the north of the fortress across the Kronverksky Strait lies the Kronverk, formerly the fortress' outer defence and now home to the Military Historical Museum of Artillery, Engineers and Signal Corps.

=== Midday Cannon Shot ===
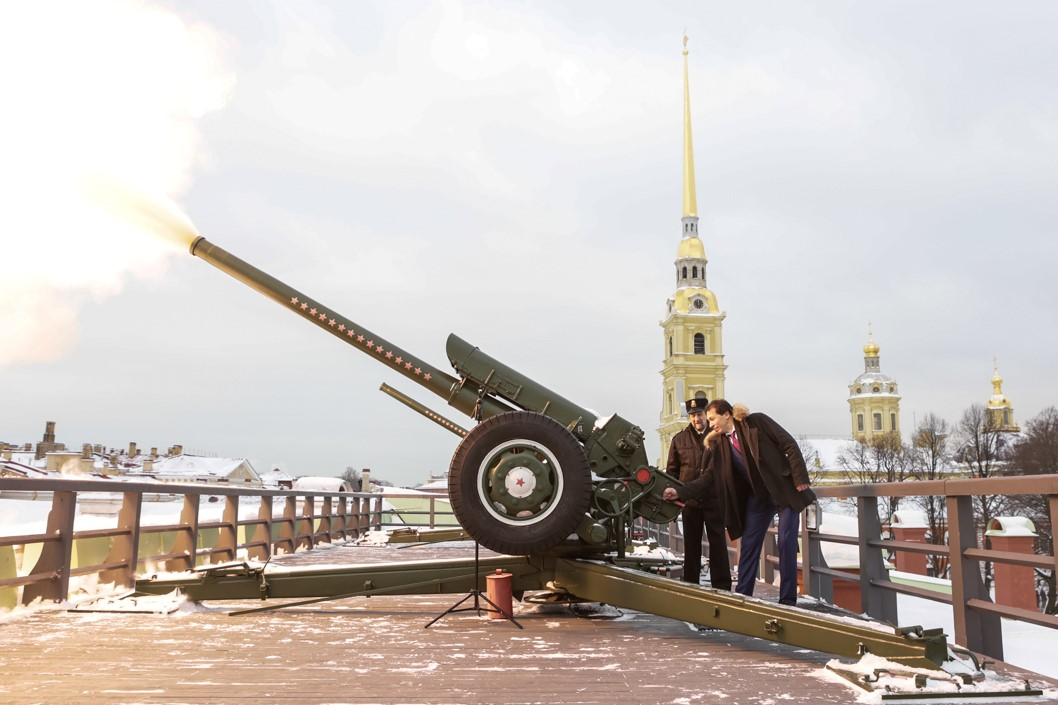
Midday cannon shot on 8 February 2018 (dedicated to the birthday of Saint Petersburg State University, Professor Nikolay Kuznetsov).

During the time of Peter the Great, a shot from the cannon of the Peter and Paul Fortress was heard in honor of military victories, on holidays, and also to warn residents about the rise in the water level of the Neva.

Since 1873, the cannon is fired at noon. Residents of the city even checked their watches by the shot. The gun was silent only in times of revolutions and wars. However, nowadays the gunshot can be heard every day at 12 noon.
