= Kronverksky Strait =

Water strait in St. Petersburg, Russia

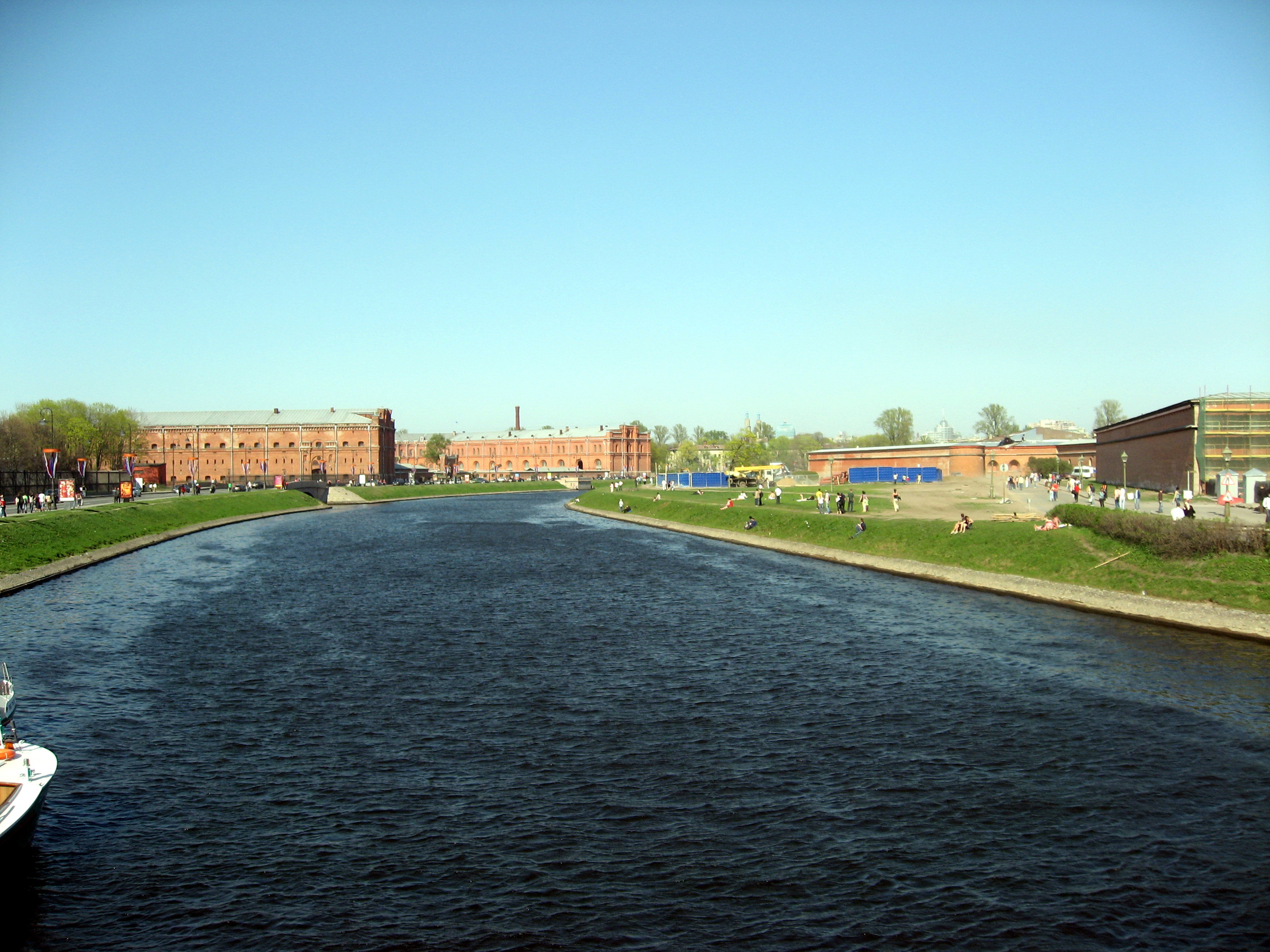
- Location: St. Petersburg, Russia

Specifications
- Length: 1 km (0.62 miles)

Geography
- Start point: Neva
- End point: Neva
- Beginning coordinates: 59°57′05″N 30°19′26″E
- Ending coordinates: 59°56′56″N 30°18′30″E

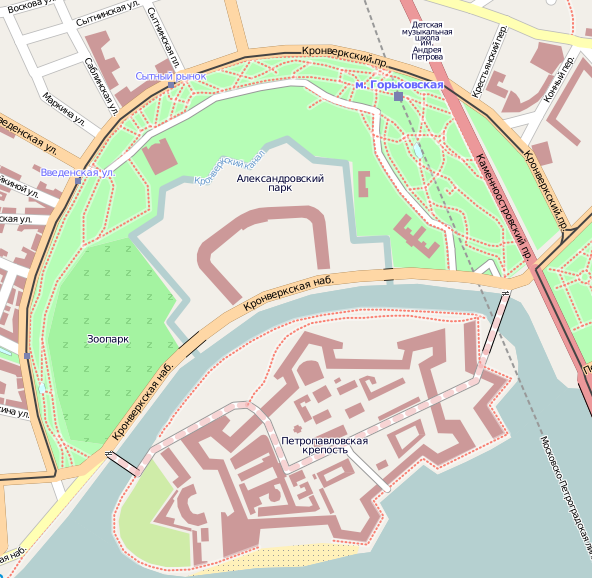
Kronverksky Strait, between Petrogradsky and Zayachy islands

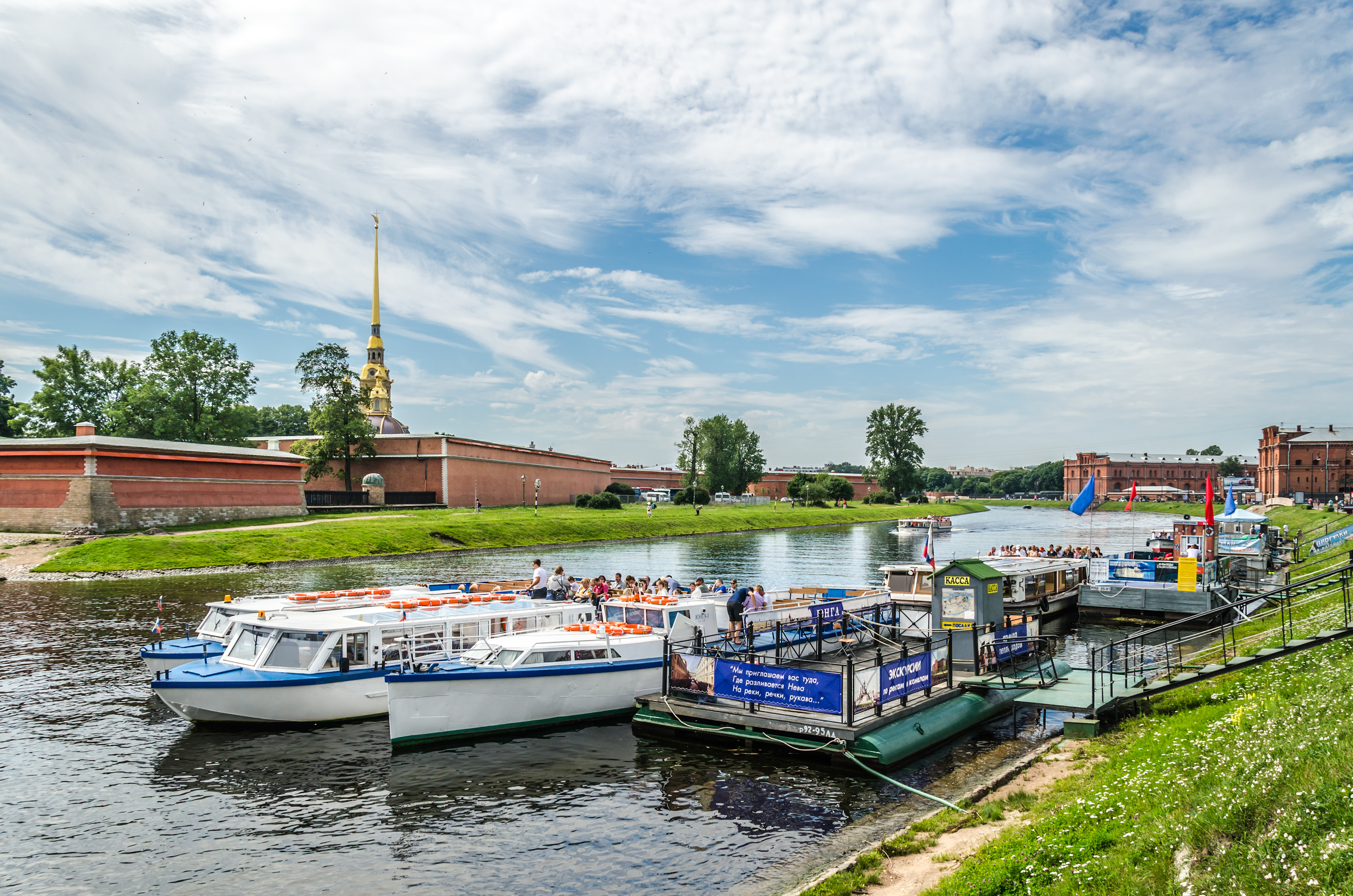
Landing stage at Kronverksky Strait

The Kronverksky Strait (Russian: Кронверкский пролив) is a narrow channel separating Petrogradsky and Zayachy islands in Saint Petersburg, Russia. It forms an arc approximately 1 kilometre (0.6 mi) long, about 50 metres (160 ft) wide and 4 metres (13 ft) deep. To the south is Zayachy Island, which is dominated by the Sts. Peter and Paul Fortress, and to the north is the Kronverk on Petrogradsky Island. It is spanned by the Kronverksky Bridge to the east and the Ioannovsky Bridge to the west.

The Ioannovsky Bridge was the first bridge built in Saint Petersburg. It was originally constructed in 1703 as a floating wooden bridge, but was reinforced and rebuilt of sturdier materials over the years.
