= Climate of Saint Petersburg =

The climate of St. Petersburg is warm-summer humid continental (Koppen Dfb), featuring short, warm summers, and long, cold (though not severe by Russian standards) winters. This region is characterized by frequent changes in air masses, largely due to cyclonic activity. Westerly and northwesterly winds prevail in summer, westerly and southwesterly in winter.

St. Petersburg weather stations have had data since 1722. The highest temperature recorded in St. Petersburg is +37.1 °C and the lowest is −41 °C.

== General characteristics ==
The climate of St. Petersburg is warm-summer humid continental (Koppen Dfb), featuring short, warm summers, and long, cold (though not severe by Russian standards) winters. This type of climate is explained by the geographical location and atmospheric circulation characteristic of the Leningrad region. This is due to the relatively small amount of solar heat entering the Earth's surface and atmosphere.

Due to the small amount of solar heat, moisture evaporates slowly. The total influx of solar radiation here is 1.5 times less than in the south of Ukraine, and half as much as in Central Asia. There are an average of 75 sunny days per year in St. Petersburg. Therefore, days with cloudy, cloudy weather and diffuse lighting prevail for most of the year. The length of the day in St. Petersburg varies from 5 hours 51 minutes on the winter solstice to 18 hours 50 minutes on the summer solstice. The so-called "white nights" are observed in the city, coming on 25–26 May, when the sun sinks below the horizon by no more than 9°, and evening twilight practically merges with morning. The white nights end on 16–17 July. In total, the duration of the white nights is more than 50 days. The annual amplitude of direct solar radiation on a horizontal surface under clear skies ranges from 25 MJ/m2 in December to 686 MJ/m2 in June. On average, cloud cover reduces the arrival of total solar radiation by 21% per year, and direct solar radiation by 60%. The average annual total radiation is 3156 MJ/m2. The number of hours of sunshine is 1,628 per year.

According to long-term observations, St. Petersburg is characterized by a "heat island" effect, in which the temperature in the city is higher than in the surrounding areas.

Climate data for Saint Petersburg (1991–2020 normals, extremes 1743–present)
Month	Jan	Feb	Mar	Apr	May	Jun	Jul	Aug	Sep	Oct	Nov	Dec	Year
Record high °C (°F)	8.7 (47.7)	10.2 (50.4)	16.1 (61.0)	25.3 (77.5)	33.0 (91.4)	35.9 (96.6)	35.3 (95.5)	37.1 (98.8)	30.4 (86.7)	21.0 (69.8)	12.3 (54.1)	10.9 (51.6)	37.1 (98.8)
Mean daily maximum °C (°F)	−2.5 (27.5)	−2.4 (27.7)	2.3 (36.1)	9.5 (49.1)	16.3 (61.3)	20.5 (68.9)	23.3 (73.9)	21.4 (70.5)	15.9 (60.6)	8.7 (47.7)	2.8 (37.0)	−0.5 (31.1)	9.6 (49.3)
Daily mean °C (°F)	−4.8 (23.4)	−5.0 (23.0)	−1.0 (30.2)	5.2 (41.4)	11.5 (52.7)	16.1 (61.0)	19.1 (66.4)	17.4 (63.3)	12.4 (54.3)	6.2 (43.2)	0.9 (33.6)	−2.5 (27.5)	6.3 (43.3)
Mean daily minimum °C (°F)	−7.2 (19.0)	−7.6 (18.3)	−4.0 (24.8)	1.7 (35.1)	7.2 (45.0)	12.2 (54.0)	15.3 (59.5)	13.9 (57.0)	9.4 (48.9)	4.1 (39.4)	−0.9 (30.4)	−4.5 (23.9)	3.3 (37.9)
Record low °C (°F)	−35.9 (−32.6)	−35.2 (−31.4)	−29.9 (−21.8)	−21.8 (−7.2)	−6.6 (20.1)	0.1 (32.2)	4.9 (40.8)	1.3 (34.3)	−3.1 (26.4)	−12.9 (8.8)	−22.2 (−8.0)	−34.4 (−29.9)	−35.9 (−32.6)
Average precipitation mm (inches)	46 (1.8)	36 (1.4)	36 (1.4)	37 (1.5)	47 (1.9)	69 (2.7)	84 (3.3)	87 (3.4)	57 (2.2)	64 (2.5)	56 (2.2)	51 (2.0)	670 (26.4)
Average extreme snow depth cm (inches)	15 (5.9)	19 (7.5)	14 (5.5)	1 (0.4)	0 (0)	0 (0)	0 (0)	0 (0)	0 (0)	0 (0)	3 (1.2)	9 (3.5)	19 (7.5)
Average rainy days	9	7	10	13	16	18	17	17	20	20	16	10	173
Average snowy days	25	23	16	8	1	0.1	0	0	0.1	5	16	23	117
Average relative humidity (%)	86	84	79	69	65	69	71	76	80	83	86	87	78
Mean monthly sunshine hours	18.9	45.5	120.5	177.9	255.6	254.3	267.7	228.1	134.8	61.8	23.0	8.1	1,596.2
Source 1: Pogoda.ru.net
Source 2: NOAA

=== Atmospheric circulation ===
From the west and southwest, from the Atlantic Ocean, where the Azores anticyclone and the Icelandic minimum pressure are located, moist sea air enters the region, which has a mitigating effect on the climate. The city is characterized by warm, rainy summers and relatively mild winters. From the north and northeast, from the polar region of high pressure, cold and dry Arctic air masses enter the region, forming over the ice of the Arctic Ocean. It affects the climate of the region and the area of high pressure in Central Asia. From these areas, from the east and southeast, continental air enters the region, bringing dry and clear weather.

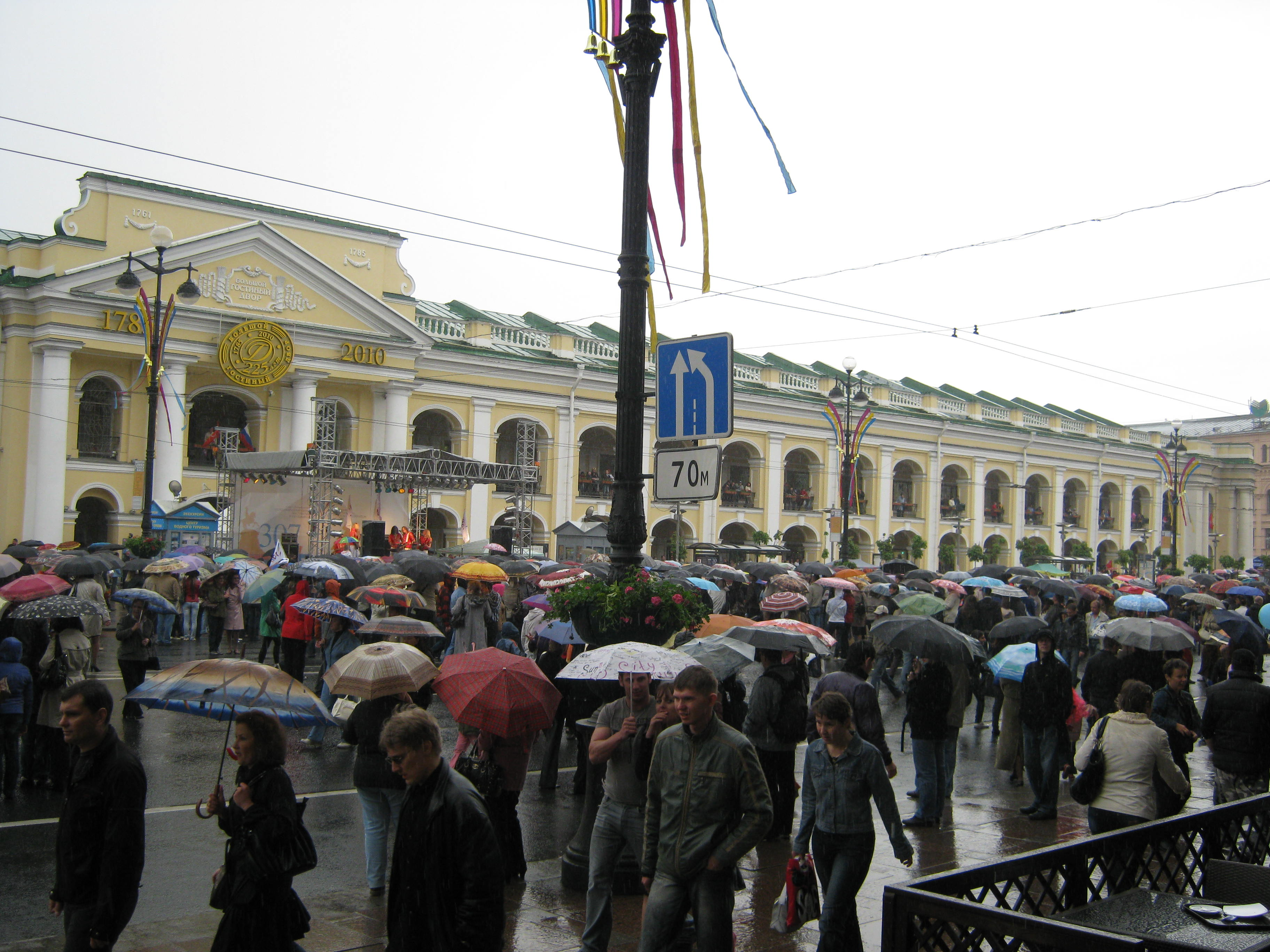
Torrential rain on Nevsky Prospekt, during the celebration of the "City Day".

The air masses coming from the Atlantic have the greatest impact on the climate of the region. On average, winds from the western, north-western and south-western directions account for almost 46% (in autumn – about 50%) of all winds, winds from the northern and eastern directions – 28%, and south and south-eastern – 26%. The result of the change and interaction of air masses from different directions is the typical long-term variability of the weather and its instability throughout the year.

The urban conditions that create a special microclimate have a noticeable effect on the climate of St. Petersburg (as well as any large city). Dust, smoke, soot and other impurities in the air reduce solar radiation during the daytime, and at night they delay terrestrial radiation, slowing down the cooling of the Earth's surface. In summer, stone buildings and road surfaces become very hot and accumulate heat, and at night they give it to the atmosphere; in winter, the air receives additional heat from heating buildings. In summer, daytime temperatures in the center of St. Petersburg are 2–3 degrees higher than in the suburbs, and the relative humidity is 15–20% lower; in winter, the temperature difference can reach 10–12 degrees, and humidity up to 40%. The warmest part of the city is Nevsky Prospekt. The wind in the city is weaker than in the surrounding area in open areas (on average by 1–2 m/s)

=== Air temperature ===
The average annual air temperature in St. Petersburg, according to observations for 1991–2020, is +6.3 °C. The lowest average annual air temperature, +0.9 °C, was recorded in 1809 and the highest temperature is +8.2 °C in 2020. The coldest month in the city is February with an average temperature of −5.0 °C, in January −4.8 °C. The warmest month is July, with an average daily temperature of +19.1 °C. The relatively small range of average daily temperatures in February and July (24.1 °C) characterizes the moderation of the St. Petersburg climate. The highest temperature recorded in St. Petersburg for the entire observation period is +37.1 °C (7 August 2010), and the lowest temperature is −41 °C (in 1758 and 1767).

The first day with an average positive temperature is in early April, and the first day with an average temperature below zero is in mid—November. The average duration of the entire period with a positive average daily temperature is 230 days, and with temperatures above +5 °C – 165 days.

Maximum and minimum average monthly air temperature (1744–2023)
Month	Jan	Feb	Mar	Apr	May	Jun	Jul	Aug	Sep	Oct	Nov	Dec
Highest, °C	1,5 (2020)	1,7 (1990)	3,6 (2007)	8,3 (1921)	15,9 (1897)	21,4 (2021)	24,4 (2010)	20,6 (2022)	17,0 (2024)	9,3 (1775)	4,4 (2013)	3,0 (2006)
Lowest, °C	−21,4 (1814)	−19,5 (1871)	−11,5 (1942)	−3,7 (1790)	2,1 (1867)	11,1 (1810)	14,1 (1837)	12,6 (1856)	7,0 (1894)	−0,5 (1880)	−10,0 (1774)	−18,4 (1788)

=== Precipitation, relative humidity, and cloud cover ===
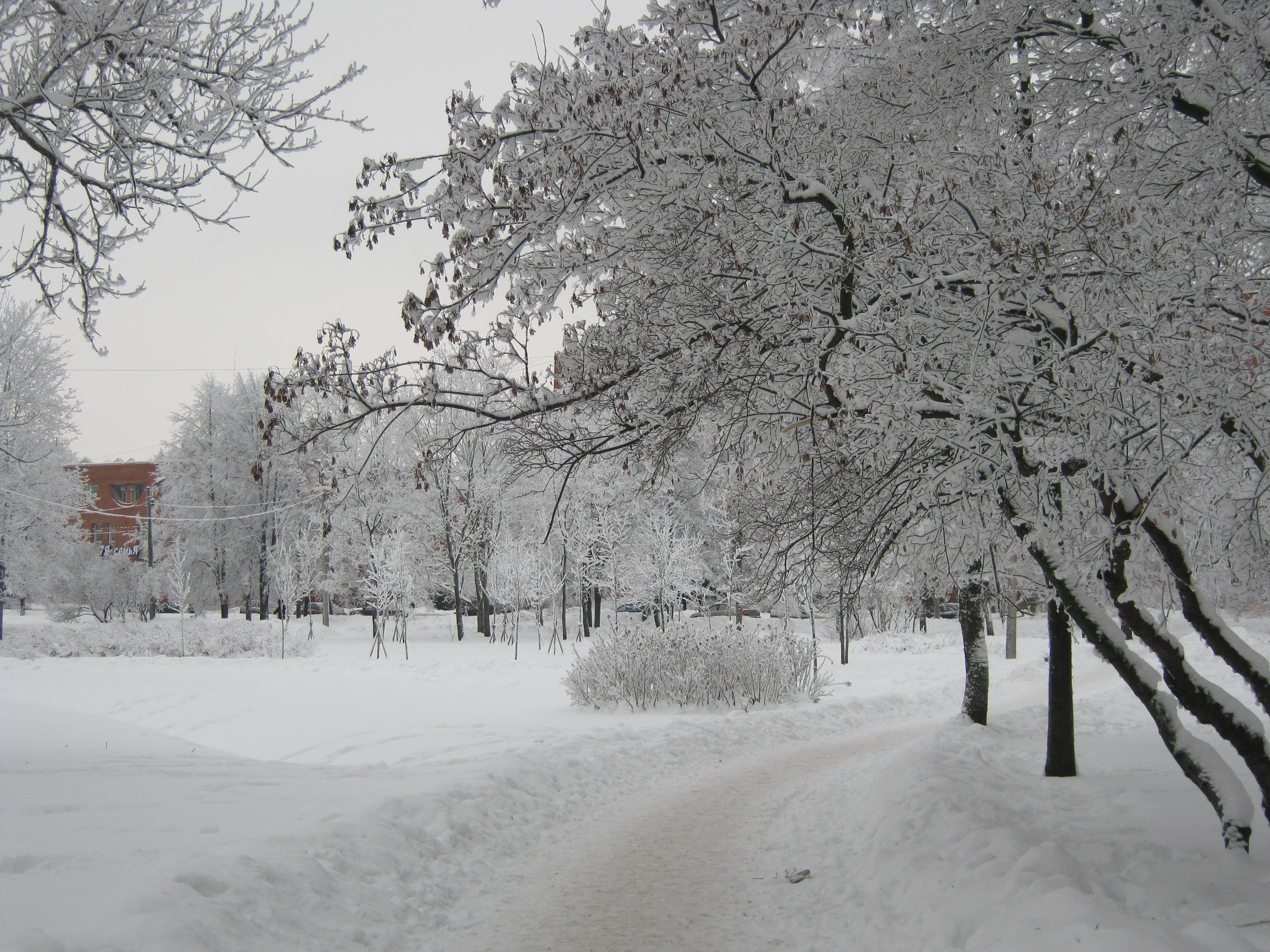
Frost on the trees in winter. Kolpino, 15 January 2010

The average annual precipitation in St. Petersburg is about 662 mm. But the amount of precipitation is about 200–250 mm higher than the evaporation of moisture, which causes increased moisture. The air humidity in St. Petersburg is always high. The annual average is about 75%, in summer – 60–70%, and in winter – 80–96%. Most precipitation falls from April to October, with a maximum in August and a minimum in March. During the year, the average number of days with precipitation is about 200 (from 13 days in April to 22 days in December), the average number of hours with precipitation per year is 1300. The rainiest summer was 1928, when 451 mm of precipitation fell (with the norm being 256 mm). The rainiest was in the summer of 1928, when 451 mm of precipitation fell (with a norm of 256 mm). The driest summer was the summer of 1858, when 98 mm of precipitation fell in St. Petersburg. In the 20th century, the rainiest days in St. Petersburg were in August 1935 and 1947.In August 1935, 65 to 90 mm of precipitation fell in the city in one day. Many streets were covered with a layer of 30–35 cm of water, the total volume of rain fell was about 35 million m3. On 8 August 1947, 76 mm of precipitation fell in the city, which exceeded the daily precipitation rate by 25–30 times.

The first snow usually falls in early November and persists until mid-April. Stable snow cover lasts from 110 to 145 days, on average from the beginning of December to the end of March. By the end of February, the snow cover reaches a maximum height of about 30–32 cm. Significant cloud cover is also typical in conditions of high humidity. On average, there are only 30 cloudless days in St. Petersburg per year. The highest cloud cover is in winter (over 80%), the lowest in summer (about 50%). Fogs are observed, especially in autumn and early winter; the average number of fog days per year is about 32.

Amount of precipitation 1740–2025 (daily after 1882) mm
Month	Jan	Feb	Mar	Apr	May	Jun	Jul	Aug	Sep	Oct	Nov	Dec
Minimum	2	3	1	2	2	5	5	1	2	5	2	4
Average for 1991–2020	46	36	35	37	47	69	83	86	57	63	56	51
Maximum	102	92	90	99	139	199	166	197	190	150	118	112
Maximum per day	23	24	26	29	56	45	69	76	34	37	28	28

Snow depth (1890–2016), cm
Month	Jan	Feb	Mar	Apr	May	Jun	Jul	Aug	Sep	Oct	Nov	Dec
Average	25	31	30	10	0	0	0	0	0	3	11	18
Maximum	63	68	73	53	1	0	0	0	0	16	38	56

== Characteristics of the seasons of the year ==
=== Winter ===
Winter usually begins in St. Petersburg in November; its beginning coincides with the first snow (in November), establishment of snow cover (in December), ( but there are years when snow cover is established only in mid-January) and ice formation in the upper reaches of the Neva River. In the first half of winter, the weather is usually unstable, with frequent thaws. The sun is low, the day is short, and the snow cover is light. The air brought in from the west by cyclones cools quickly, and the water vapor contained in it condenses, which causes high clouds and fogs. During December, there are on average only 2 clear days. The second half of winter is noticeably colder than the first. The air coming from the west is getting colder, but less humid. Therefore, cloud cover decreases, fogs become less frequent, less precipitation falls, and Arctic air intrudes more often, lowering the temperature.

The nature of winter in St. Petersburg largely depends on the anticyclones and cyclones in the Atlantic. In years when the area of high pressure in the Atlantic expands, the Atlantic air intake increases in St. Petersburg, which makes winters warmer. According to long-term observations, such winters are repeated approximately twice in 11 years. So, in the winter of 1924/25, when the average January temperature was −0.5 °C, for 14 days the average daily temperature stayed above 0 °C, and one day reached +5 °C. That winter, the weather was cloudy, foggy, with strong winds, frequent snowfalls and thaws. Some of the warmest winters in St. Petersburg in the history of meteorological observations were observed at the beginning of the 21st century. During the period of weather anomalies in late 2006 and early 2007, new absolute temperature records were set. So, on 6 December 2006, the air temperature rose to +10.9 °C, which became the absolute maximum temperature not only for December, but also for the entire winter period in the entire history of meteorological observations. In the same winter period, the absolute maximum of January in the entire history of observations was beaten: on 10 January 2007, the temperature in St. Petersburg reached +8.7 °C, and stable snow cover that winter was formed only on 20 January.

At the same time, the winters of 2009/2010 and 2010/2011 were colder than normal and turned out to be unusually snowy. For example, during the period of 21–26 December 2009, 69 mm of precipitation fell in the form of snow, which is more than 1.5 monthly norms. And by the beginning of March 2011, the snow cover reached 73 cm, breaking the record of 1966 (68 cm). In addition, the second decade of February 2011, with an average temperature of −19.5 °C for 10 days, became the coldest in the history of observations.

During the years of expansion of the low pressure area in the Atlantic Ocean in the northeast, the influx of Arctic air increases, and St. Petersburg usually experiences cold winters. According to the long-term average data, this happens about once every 10 years. During the siege of Leningrad in the winter of 1941/42, the average January temperature was −18.7 °C (10 °C lower than usual), and on some days the temperature dropped to −30... -35 °C, there were no thaws, and the snow cover reached 60 cm. There was a similar cold winter in 1965/66. The absolute minimum of −35.9 °C was recorded on 11 January 1883.

Winter in St. Petersburg

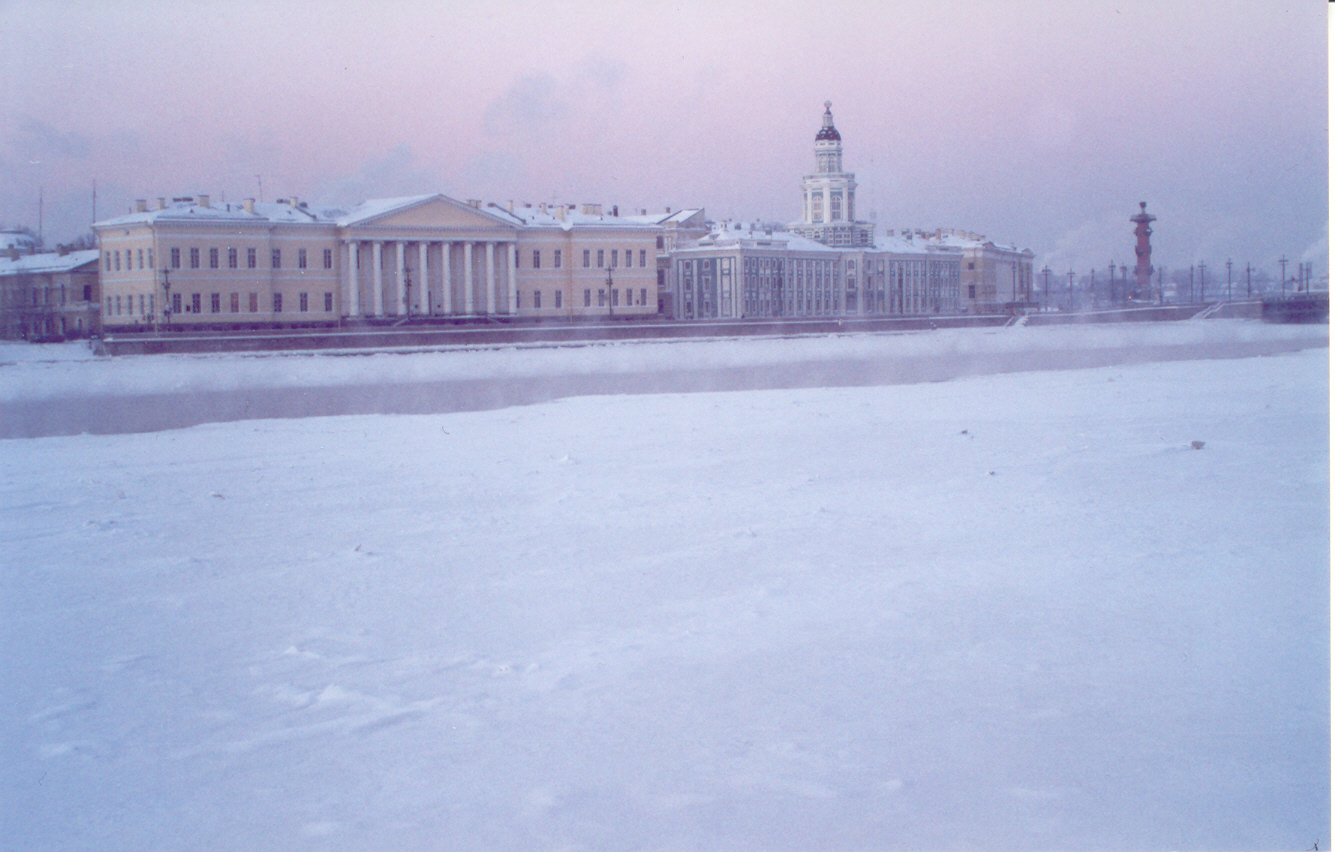
Neva February 5, 1998

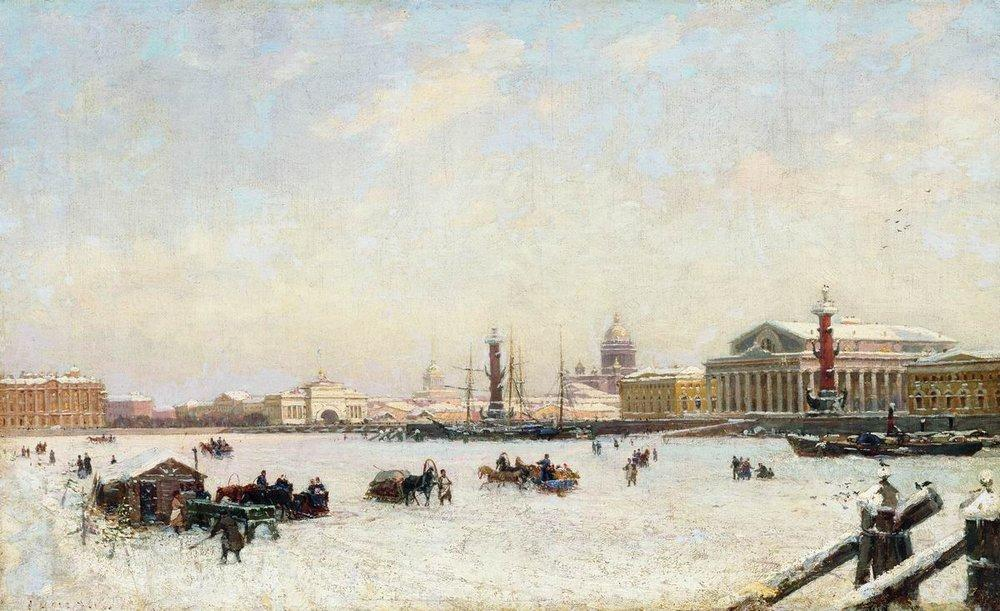
"Petersburg in winter". Painting by A. K. Beggrov, 1898

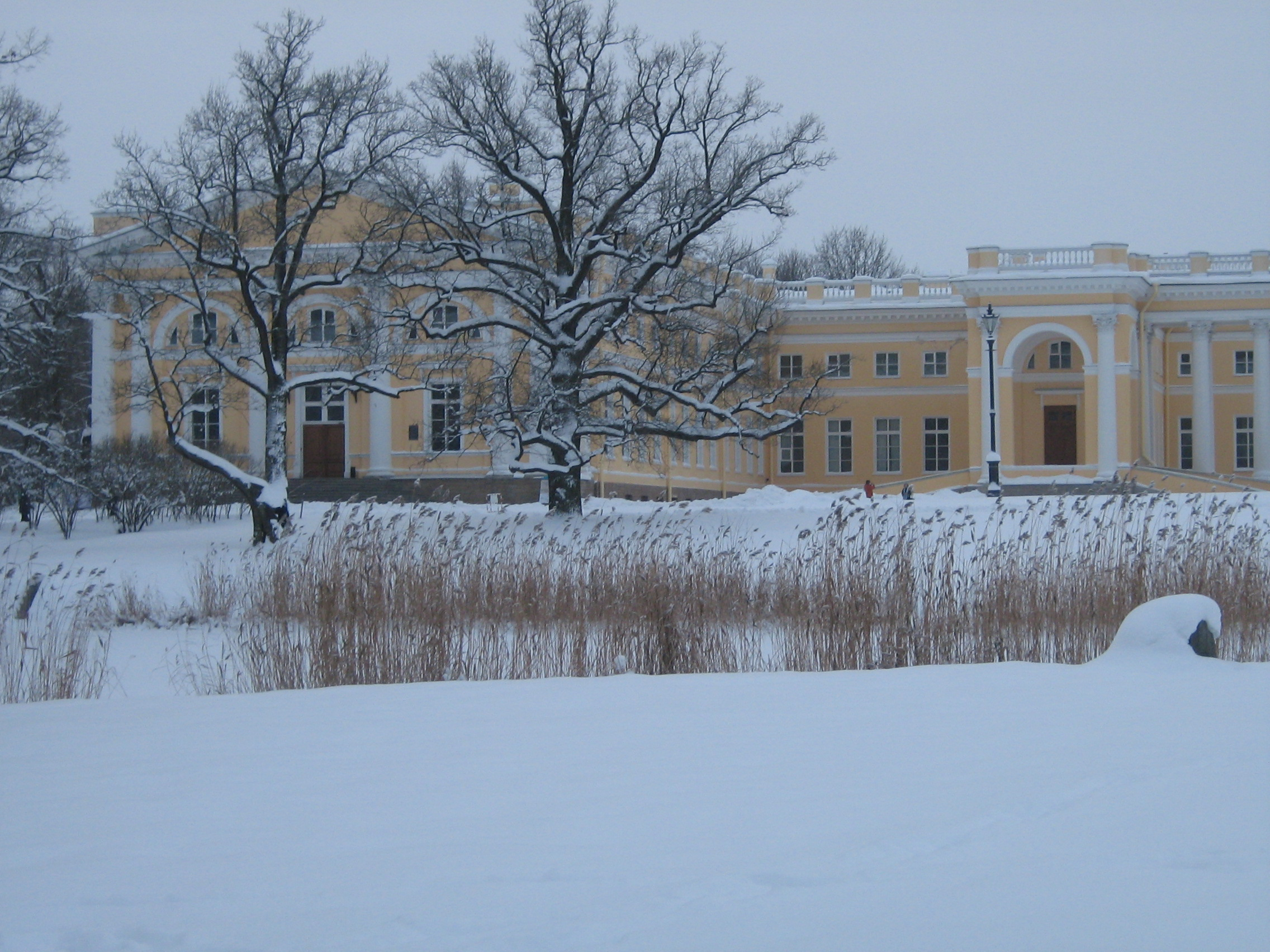
Alexander Palace in Pushkin on December 17, 2010

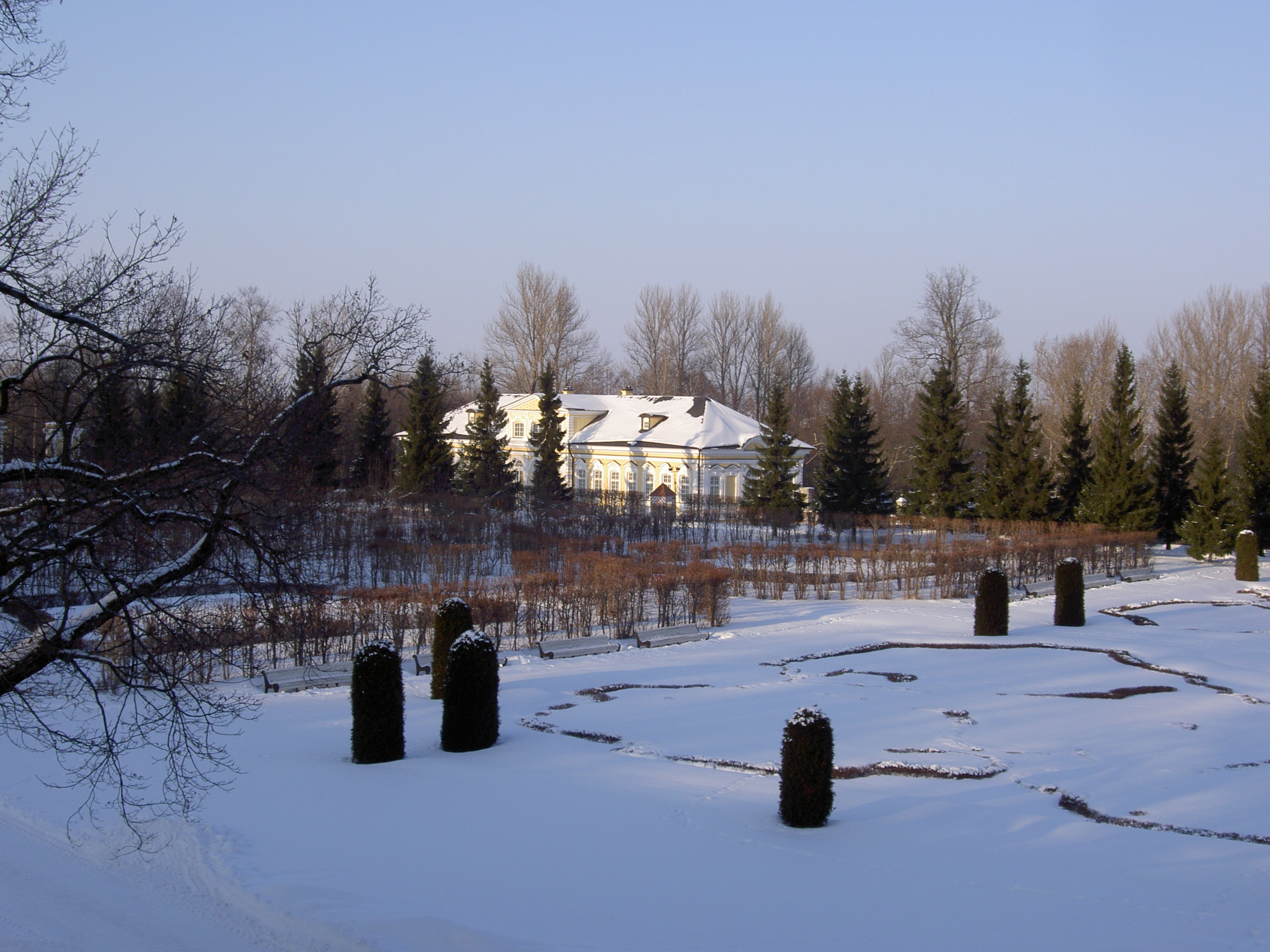
The Picture House in Lomonosov. February 16, 2006

=== Spring ===
Spring in St. Petersburg usually begins at the end of March, when daytime air temperatures become steadily positive and the snow cover begins to fall. Spring "wakes up" more slowly than in neighboring, more continental areas: the influence of large reservoirs cooled during the winter is affected. The average daily temperature above 0 °C is set in early April, shortly after the snow melts; it reaches 5 °C by the end of April and 10 °C in May. Atmospheric pressure is highest in spring, and cyclones are rare, so the weather is relatively stable. The number of days with precipitation is lower than in other periods of the year, 13.9 in March (12.7–12.8 in April, May), less cloudy than in winter (8–10 days with clear weather), lower relative humidity (76% in March and 60% in May) and wind speed. However, cold weather often returns. North-easterly winds sometimes bring prolonged cold weather and night frosts from the Arctic seas; they also drive Ladoga ice into the Neva. On average, the last frost is celebrated on 5 May, but it is possible until 28 May, and on the soil — on 6 June (1962). In general, for the entire spring calendar period in St. Petersburg (from 1 March to 31 May), temperatures can range from ~ -25 degrees in March to ~+30 degrees in May (if we count the whole year over the entire observation period). The absolute minimum air temperature in spring in St. Petersburg was recorded on 22 March 1883: -29.9 °C. The absolute maximum was recorded on 19 May 2014: +33 °C. At the same time, temperatures in March may exceed +10 degrees Celsius: the maximum March record was recorded on 30 March 2025: +16.1 °C. In May, the minimum temperature can reach ~ -5 °C. The minimum May record of −6.6 °C was set on 3 May 1885.

Spring in St. Petersburg

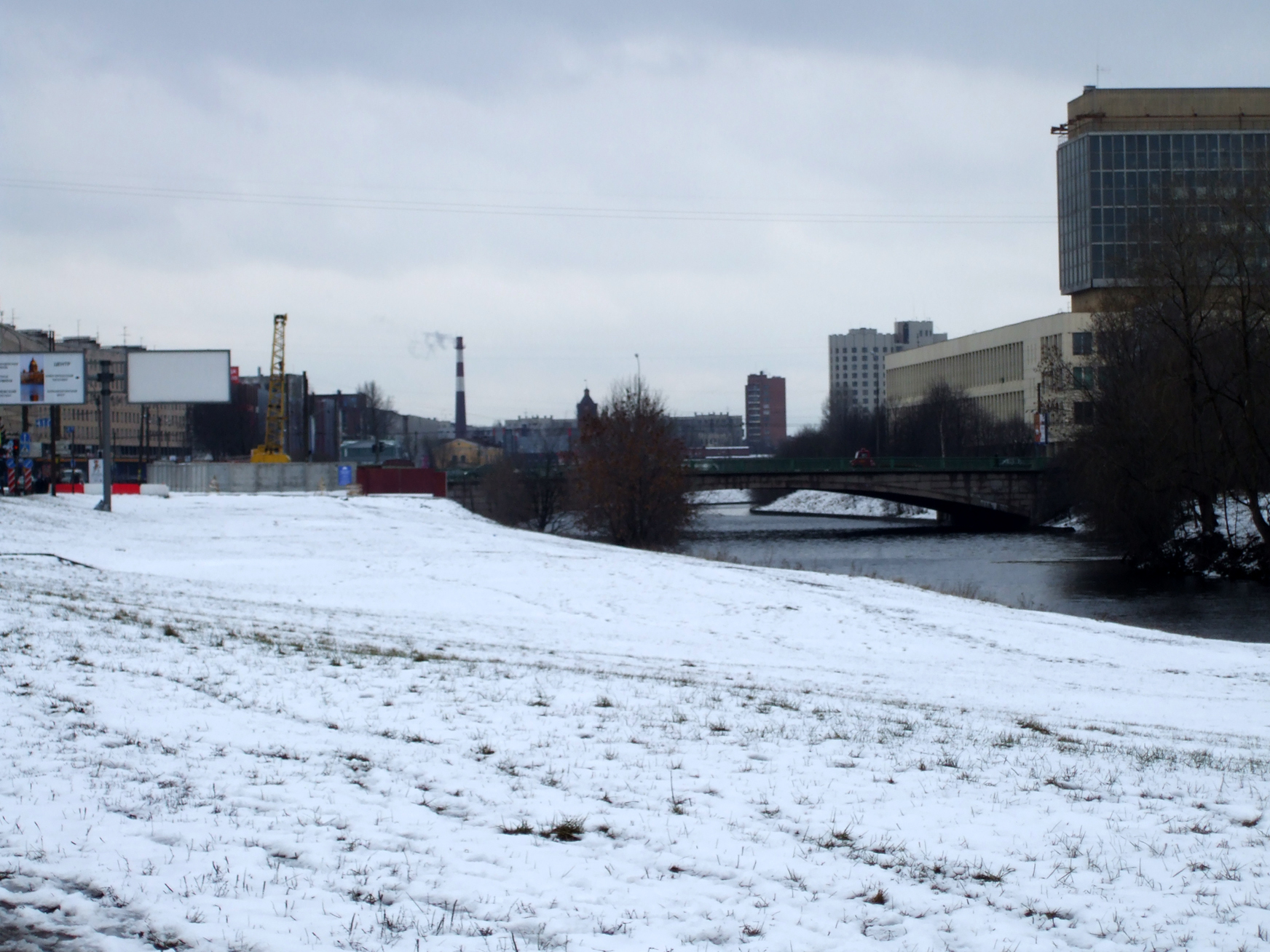
View from the Sverdlovsk embankment of the Neva River to the Bolshaya Okhta River and Komarovsky Bridge. March 23, 2008

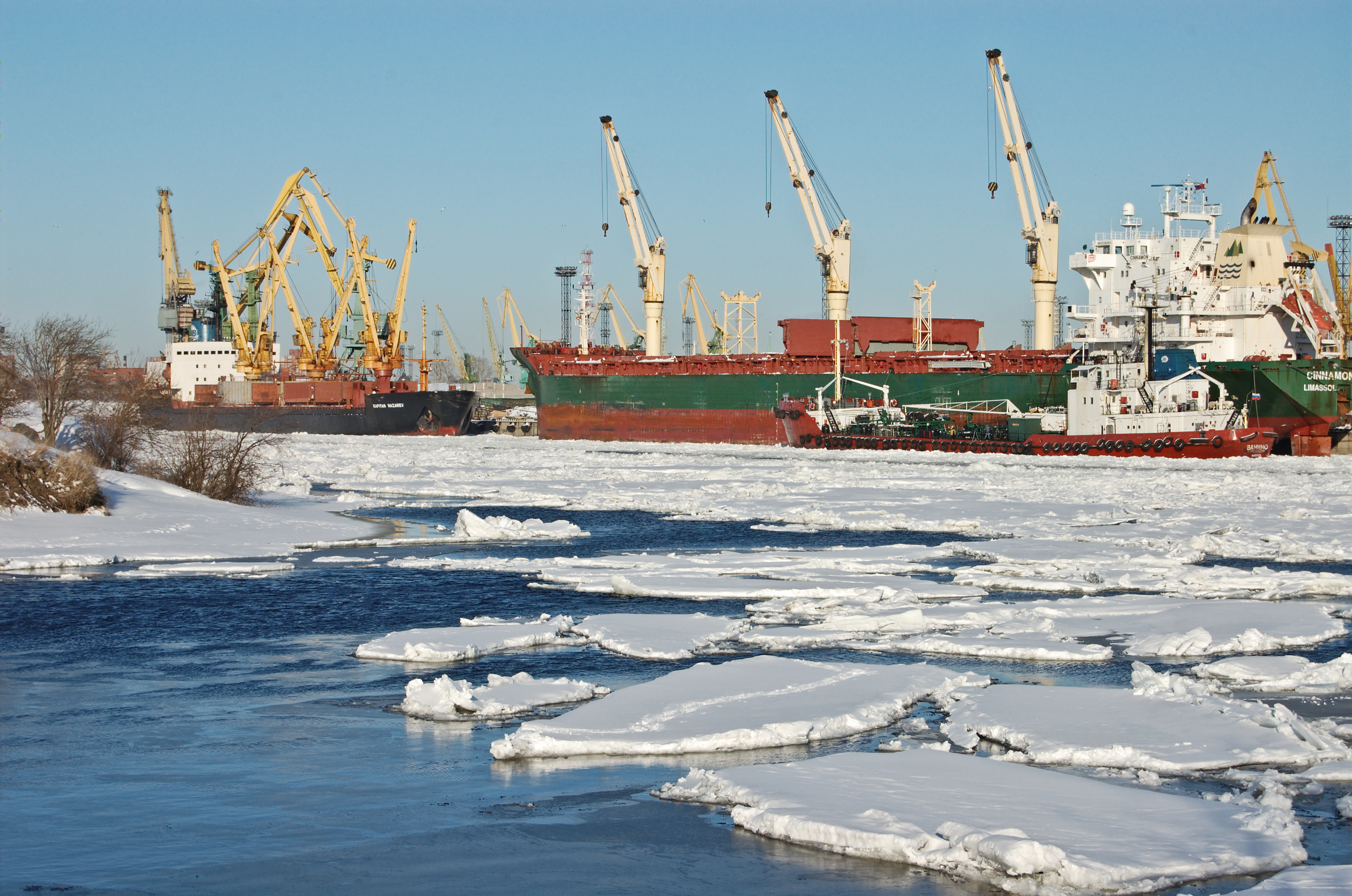
The great port of Saint Petersburg. March 22, 2010

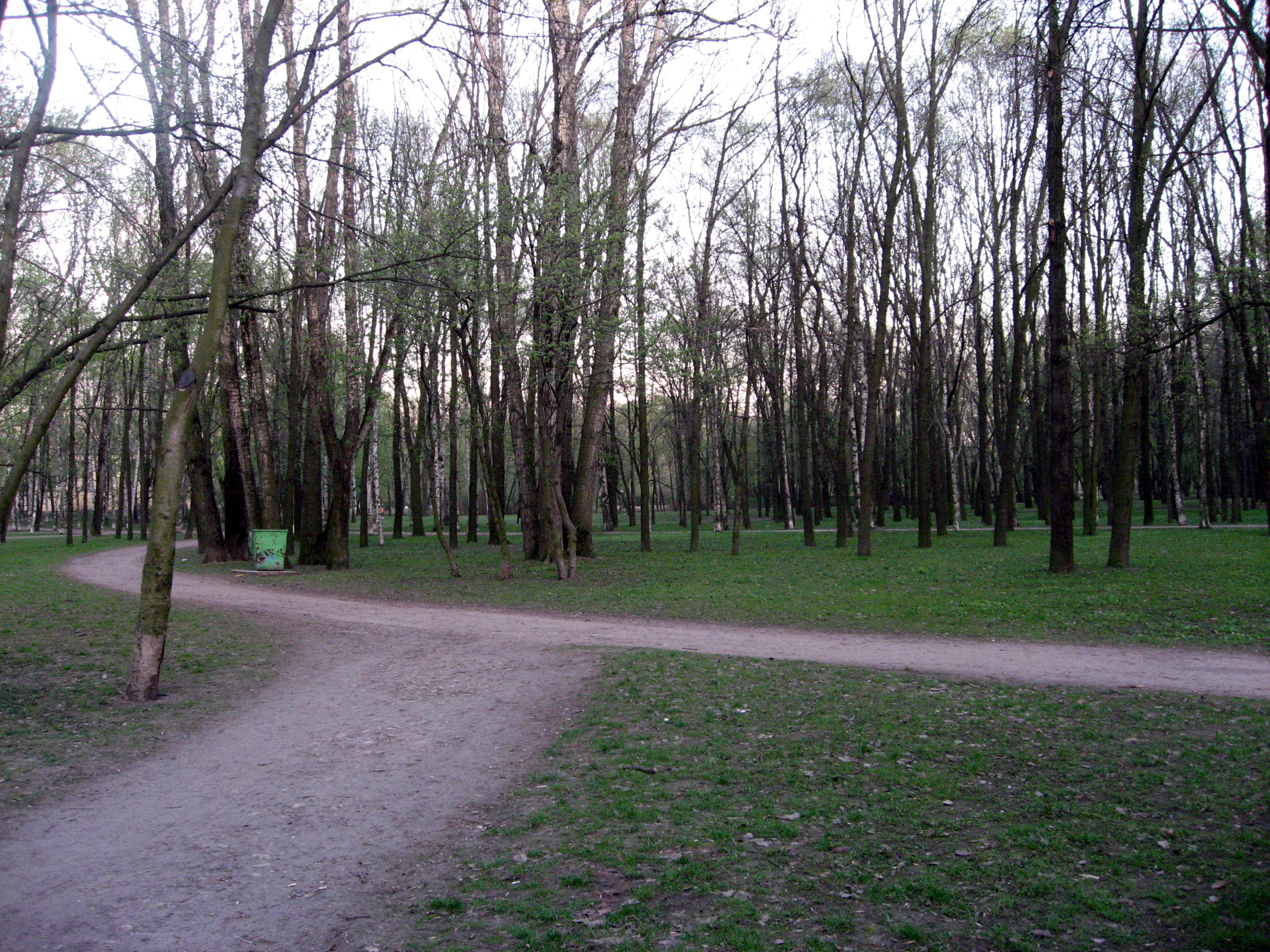
Victory Park. May 2, 2008

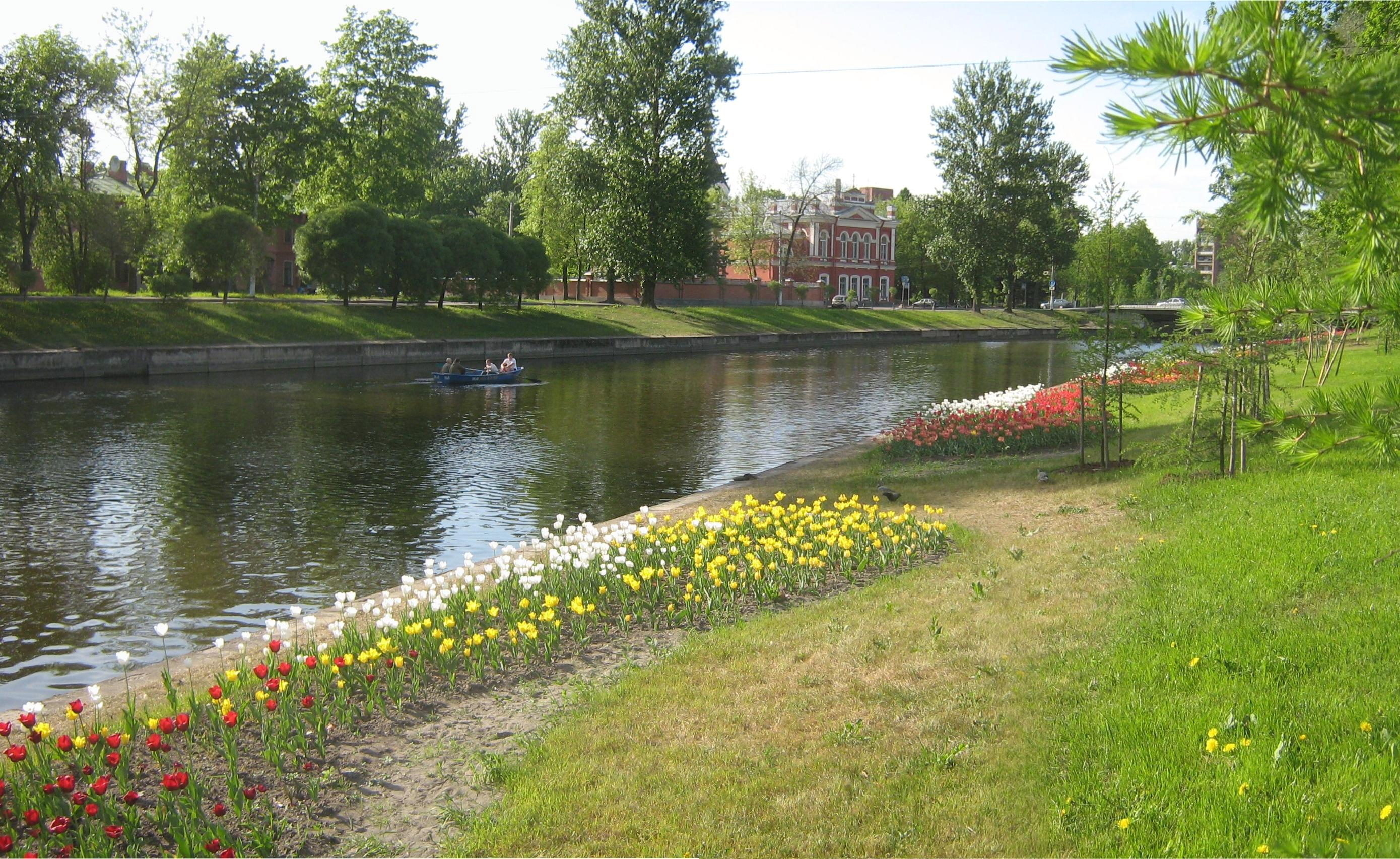
The Izhora River. May 28, 2009

=== Summer ===
In early summer, the frosts stop. The average daily temperature in June reaches +14.8 °C, and in July +17.8 °C. St. Petersburg finds itself in an area of low pressure, and Atlantic air flows to it from the west. Cyclones are intensifying, while the nature of the summer weather largely depends on the paths of their movement. As the cyclone center passes south of the city, St. Petersburg falls into the rear of the cyclone and northerly winds prevail, bringing cold and rainy weather. When the center of the cyclone passes over the Barents and White Seas, St. Petersburg falls into the warm sector of the cyclone and southerly winds prevail and the weather is nice and warm. The average temperature is above +25 °C for 16 days a year. The absolute maximum of +37.1 °C was observed on 7 August 2010. The absolute minimum of 0 °C in summer was observed in June 1930.

In the second half of summer, cyclones are more frequent and stronger. This kind of weather prevails in years with severe cyclones. It gets colder in August, with the average daily temperature dropping to +16 °C.

Summer in St. Petersburg

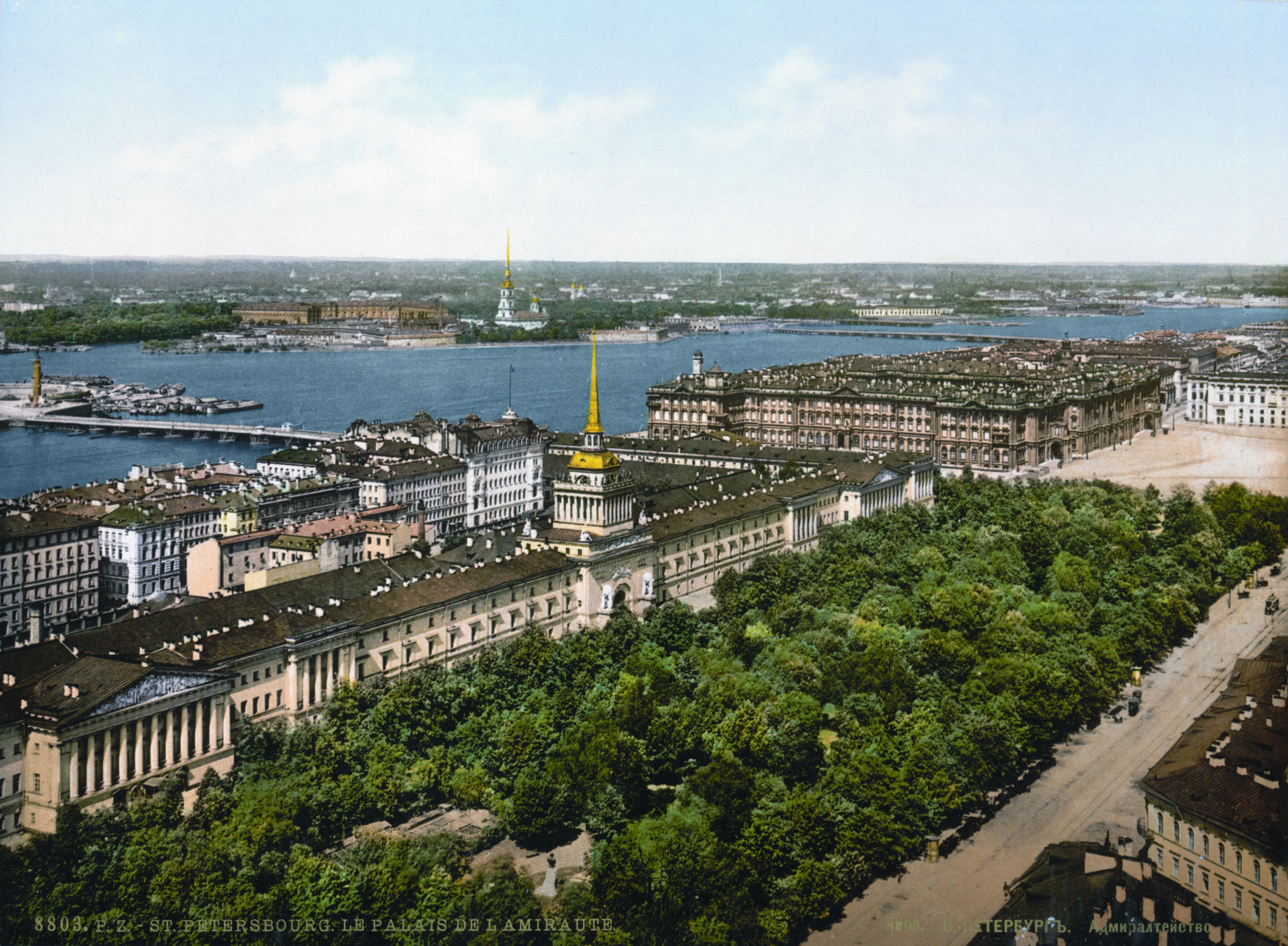
View of the Neva and the Main Admiralty 1890-1900

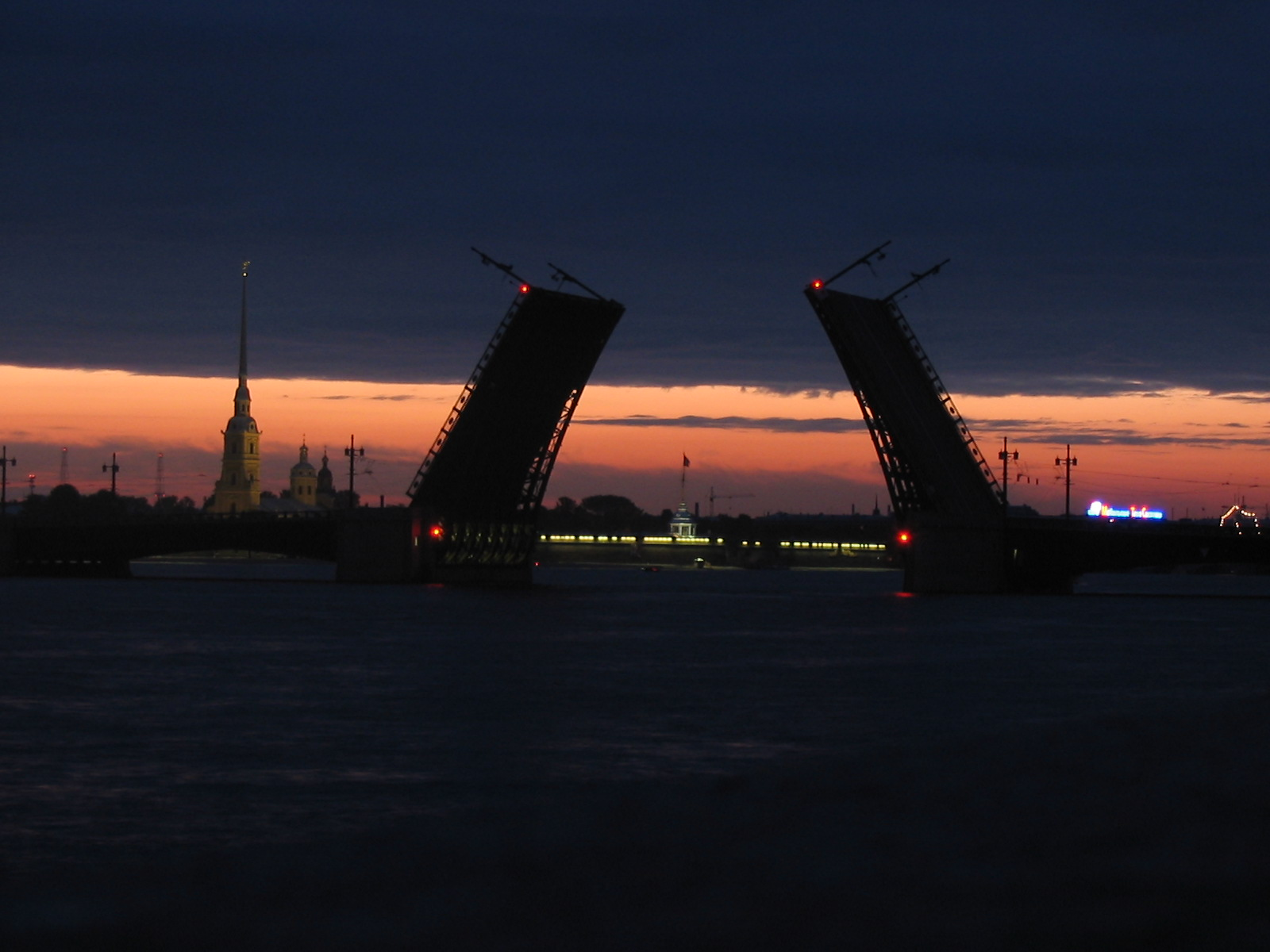
Palace Bridge. White Nights. 01:23, June 13, 2003

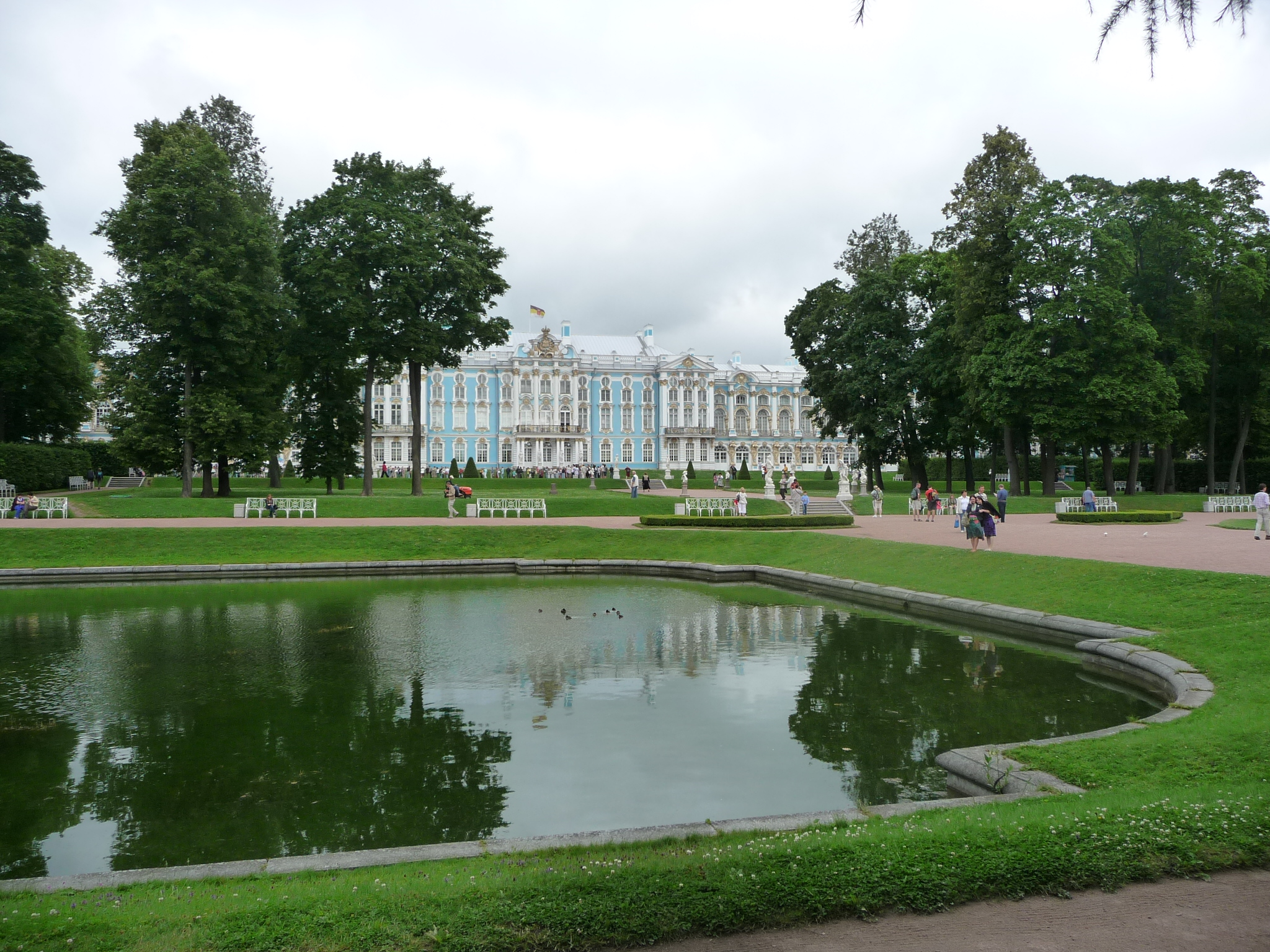
Catherine Park (Pushkin) - Catherine Park in Tsarskoe Selo. July 22, 2009

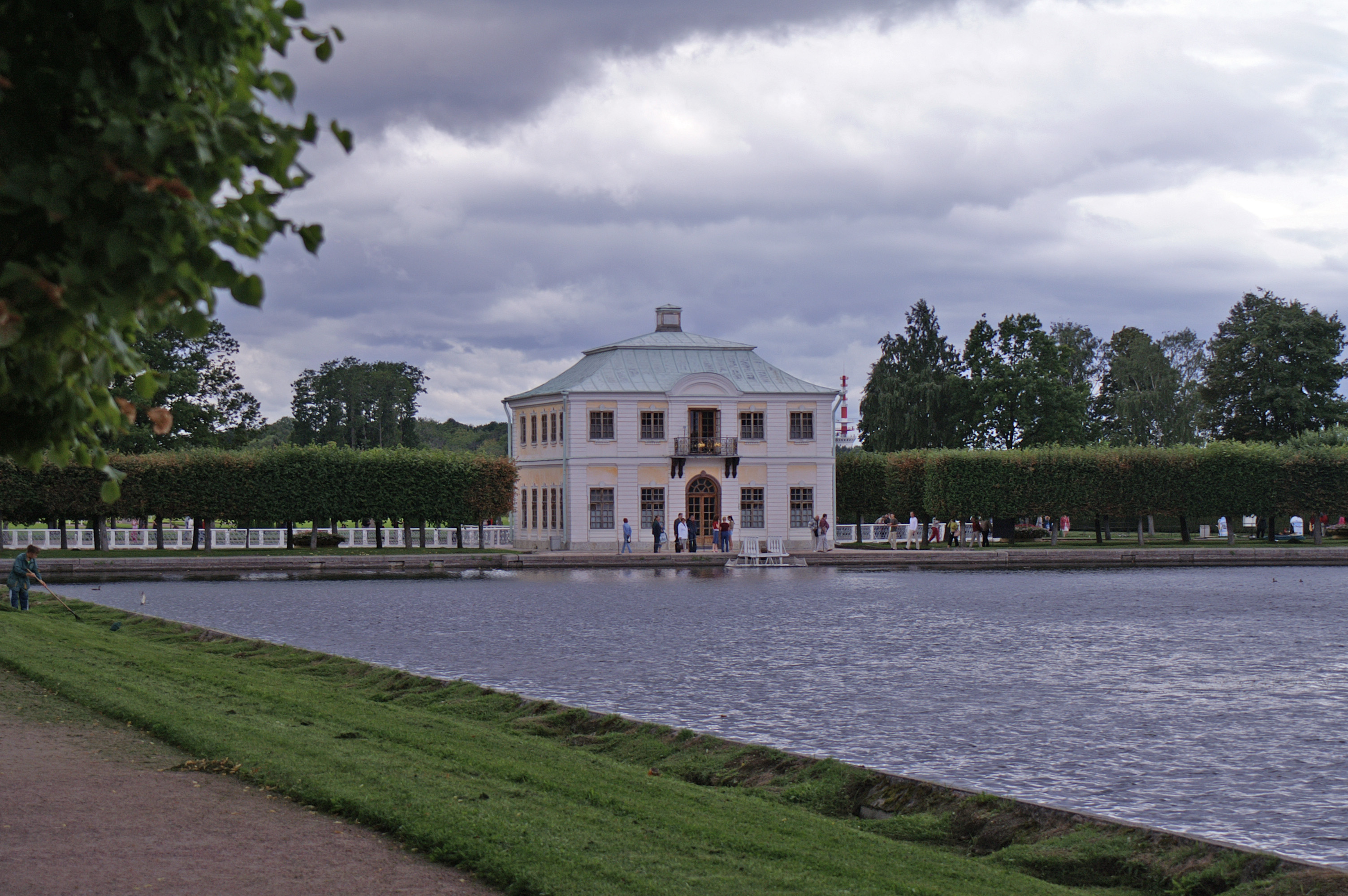
Peterhof (museum-reserve) - Lower Park in Peterhof. August 3, 2005

=== Autumn ===
Autumn in St. Petersburg begins at the end of August, when the average daily air temperature drops below +15 degrees, and daytime heat becomes very rare. The first frost occurs on average on 10 October, with the earliest recorded on 15 September 1944. Frosts occur earlier on the soil, the earliest being on 29 August 1973. During the first half of September, the weather is warm and dry; the average daily temperature usually exceeds +10 °C, although frosts occur at night. In the second half of October, cyclonic activity has been intensifying, gradually cloudy, wet and windy weather with drizzling rains becomes predominant; clouds and relative humidity increase (81–87%), wind speed increases. The average monthly temperature decreases from +10.8 °C in September to +4.8 °C in October.

At the end of September – the beginning (and sometimes the middle) In October, there is a return of heat: sunny, warm and dry weather sets in for a relatively short time. This is the so-called "Indian summer". The end of autumn is coming. The absolute maximum of autumn +30.4 °C was observed on 1 September 1992.

Autumn in St. Petersburg

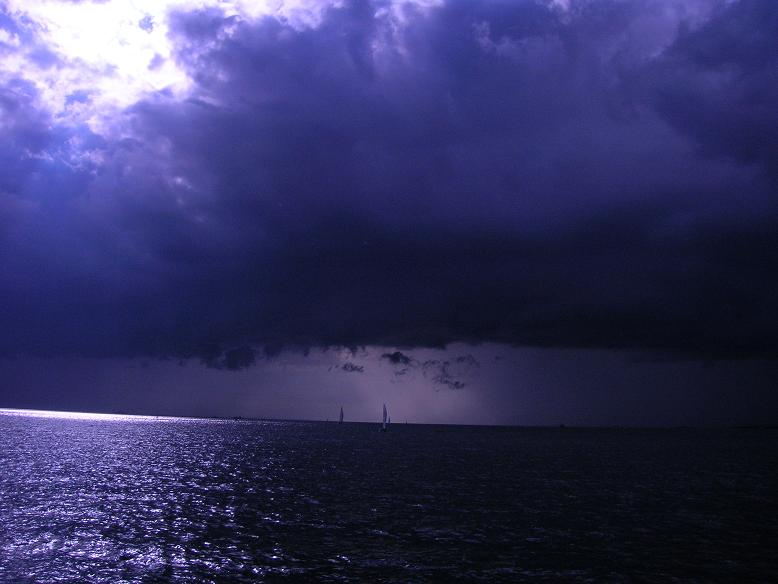
Gulf of Finland from the pier of Krestovsky Island (Saint Petersburg) - Krestovsky Island before a thunderstorm. September 30, 2011

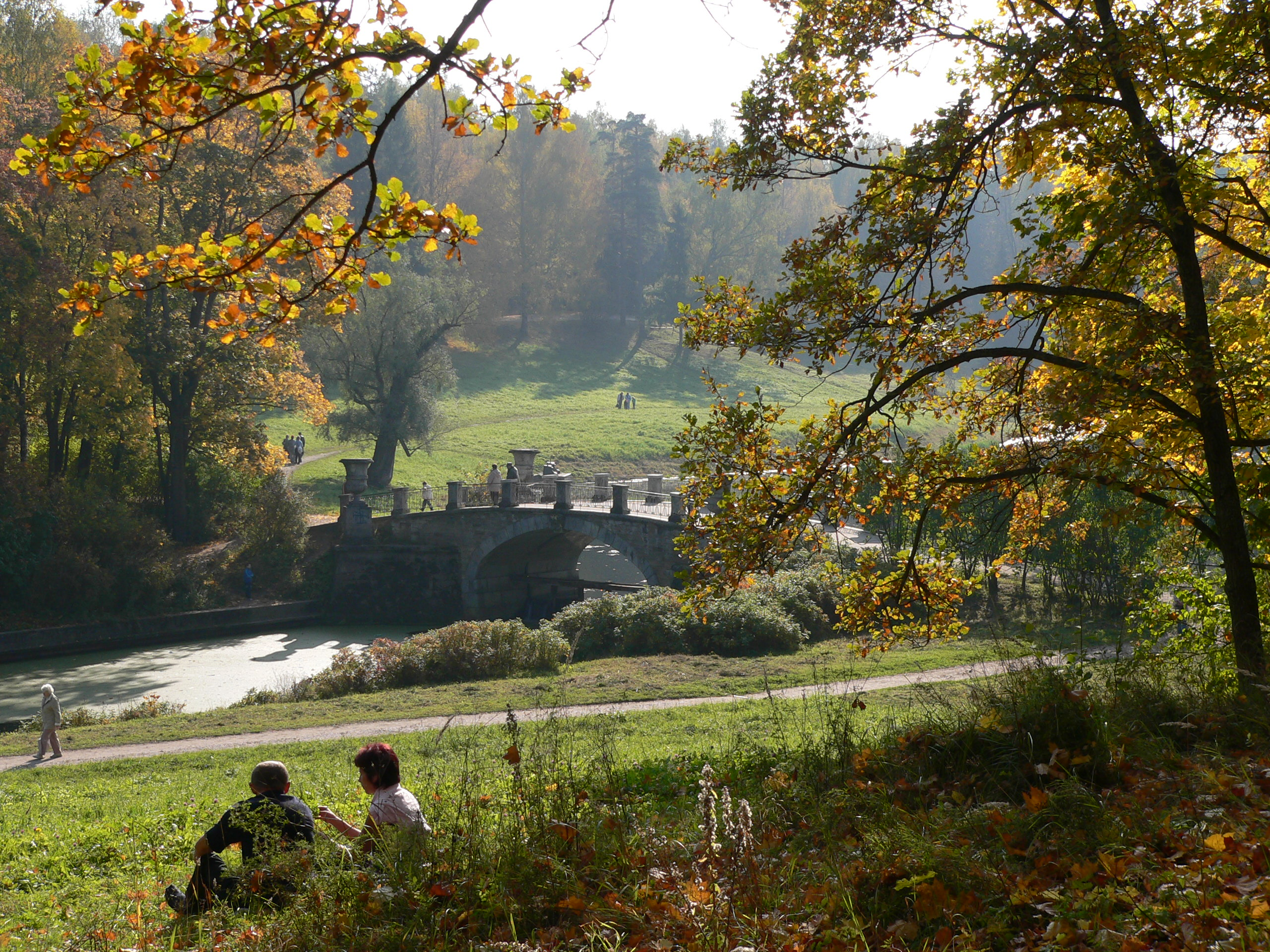
Pavlovsk Park - Park in Pavlovsk. September 29, 2007

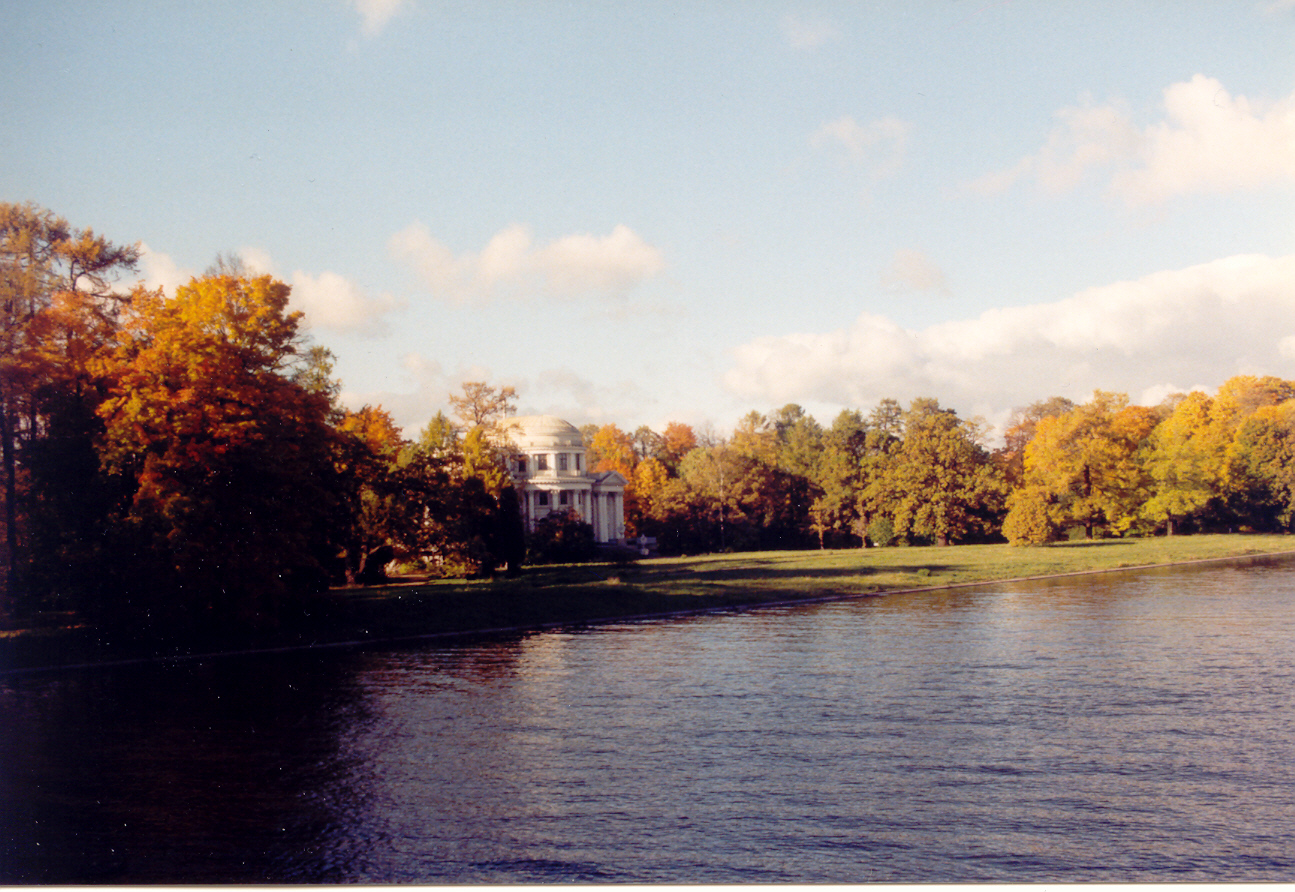
Central Park of Culture and Leisure named after S. M. Kirov - Yelagin Island. October 15, 2002

== Dangerous hydrometeorological phenomena ==
Due to the high variability of the weather, sometimes within one day, the north-western region of Russia is one of the most difficult to predict. In addition to sudden weather changes, which in themselves are unfavorable factors, almost all dangerous meteorological phenomena are observed on the territory of St. Petersburg: strong winds, including squalls and tornadoes, snowfalls and blizzards, ice, fog, severe frosts and heat, short-term intense downpours and prolonged rains, thunderstorms, hail, forest fires, droughts and floods. On 9 July 2010, a tornado was recorded during a thunderstorm in Kolpino, a suburb of St. Petersburg. He suddenly swooped down, picked up a parked VAZ car and, throwing it over the fence of the parking lot, crashed into other cars, while damaging six cars. On the street, the tornado broke trees and partially cut off power lines.

A characteristic feature of the region's climate is the dissimilarity of the weather from different years. In other years, there are very severe frosts in winter: for example, in the winter of 1941–1942, the temperature in January was 12° below the long-term average. Winters are very warm, for example, in 1924–1925, when the Neva River did not even freeze. The largest amount of precipitation in St. Petersburg in one day is 75.7 mm. This amount of water hit the city during a rainstorm on 8 August 1947.

Dangerous and catastrophic floods are frequent as a result of flooding from the Gulf of Finland. South-westerly and westerly winds lead to water surging into the Gulf of Finland and its level rising in the lower reaches of the Neva River, which causes flooding. Floods are recorded when the water rises more than 160 cm above the zero of the Kronstadt footstock or above 150 cm above the ordinarium at the Mining University. Floods with a water rise of up to 210 cm are considered dangerous, up to 299 cm – especially dangerous, over 300 cm – catastrophic. The water in the Neva rises almost annually, most often in autumn. There have been catastrophic floods in the history of the city: on 7 November (19), 1824, the strongest flood in the history of St. Petersburg occurred (described by A. S. Pushkin in the poem "The Bronze Horseman"), when the water rose 421 cm above the ordinary[26]. The largest floods were also: 23 September 1924 (water level was 369 cm), 10 September (21), 1777 (321 cm), 15 October 1955 (293 cm), 29 September 1975 (281 cm).

Snow, ice, and icicles can also fall from roofs in winter. Residents are injured, including fatally, and parked cars are suffering. According to the Rosbalt-Petersburg news agency, 18 people were hospitalized in the city from similar incidents in the last week of January and the first week of February 2010 alone. In early 2010, the governor of St. Petersburg, Valentina Matvienko, proposed cutting icicles from roofs with a laser or steam, and in early 2011, to involve students and homeless people in street cleaning. In November 2010, a competition for snow removal and anti-ice on roofs was announced. and at the end of 2010, the result was published, according to which the first place was awarded to a company that offered thermal insulation of attics using an eco-wool layer.

== Climate change ==
St. Petersburg weather stations have data for almost 300 years; for such a long period, there is no systematic meteorological information for any of the settlements in Russia, and there are not very many in the whole world.

The majority of absolute temperature minima in St. Petersburg by month were recorded back in the XVIII, XIX, or early XX century, while the beginning of the XXI century accounts for the majority of temperature maxima. At the same time, to the data obtained from the official weather station located on the Petrogradskaya side. Currently, one should be treated with a degree of caution: the temperature in the center of the metropolis is several degrees higher than on the outskirts, especially in winter. This effect of urban heat was absent in the 19th and early 20th centuries.

Daily temperature records after 1881
Highs	Minimums
+37,1 °C (7 August 2010)	−35,9 °C (11 January 1883)
+36.0 °C (23 June 2021)	
+35,3 °C (28 July 2010)	−35,6 °C (17 January 1940)
+34,6 °C (15 June 1998)	−35,2 °C (6 February 1956)
+34,5 °C (26 July 2010)	−34,7 °C (16 January 1940)
+34,3 °C (10 July 2006)	−34,7 °C (10 January 1987)
+34,3 °C (21 June 2021)	−34,6 °C (9 February 1893)
+34,2 °C (4 August 2010)	−34,4 °C (30 December 1978)
+33,7 °C (15 July 1999)	−34,2 °C (12 January 1987)
+33,7 °C (8 August 2010)	−34,0 °C (13 January 1987)
+33,6 °C (8 July 1972)	−33,7 °C (25 December 1892)
+33,5 °C (10 August 1985)	−33,4 °C (26 January 1892)
+33,4 °C (26 June 1999)	−33,2 °C (24 December 1892)
+33,3 °C (29 July 2010)	−33,0 °C (4 February 1966)
+33,2 °C (9 July 2006)	−32,9 °C (25 January 1892)
+33,1 °C (15 July 2010)	−32,8 °C (15 January 1893)
+33,0 °C (19 July 1970)	−32,8 °C (8 February 1956)
+33,0 °C (19 May 2014)	−32,7 °C (16 February 1900)

Monthly precipitation records
Highs	Minimums
191 mm (August 1933)	1 mm (March 1923)
178 mm (September 1912)	1 mm (August 1955)
166 mm (July 1976)	2 mm (May 1978)
154 mm (June 1998)	2 mm (November 1993)
150 mm (October 1984)	3 mm (February 1886)
127 mm (may 2003)	4 mm (January 1909)
117 mm (November 2010)	5 mm (October 1987)
112 мм (December 1981)	6 mm (July 1919)

== History of meteorological observations ==
Systematic meteorological observations of the weather began in St. Petersburg by decree of Peter the Great in 1722. Since 1725, meteorological observations in St. Petersburg have become instrumental. They were implemented by the Academy of Sciences. Atmospheric pressure was measured using a barometer and air temperature was measured using a thermometer. There were also observations of wind speed and direction, clouds and other atmospheric phenomena, floods, and the timing of freezing and opening of the Neva River. By 1727, a network of weather stations had been established in the city. By the end of the 19th century, the air temperature measurements of the Academy of Sciences from 1726 to 1780 had been lost[. The results of regular instrumental observations of the air temperature by the physician I. J. Lerche from 1743 to 1780 have been preserved. Lerche used thermometers of his own manufacture. In the early years, he made measurements on various temperature scales, and since 1751 exclusively on the Fahrenheit scale. Observations were made three times a day: before sunrise, at noon and in the evening. Since 1778, newspapers began publishing information about the weather.

From 1769 to 1800, air temperature measurements at the Academy of Sciences were carried out by I. A. Euler. The observations took place 3 times a day: at 6, 14 and 22 o'clock. From 1822 to 1836, observations were made by V. K. Vishnevsky using thermometers located outside the windows of the second floor of the Academy of Sciences building. In 1835, meteorological observations from the Academy of Sciences moved to another location, to the newly opened meteorological and magnetic observatory of the Institute of the Corps of Mining Engineers, located in a meadow on the 21st line of Vasilyevsky Island. The air temperature was monitored every 2 hours. From 1841 to 1862, hourly observations of air temperature were conducted.. A thermometer with a Rheaumur scale was located at a height of 1.5 m in a box mounted on a pole near the northern part of the building near the window. The box was open from the bottom and from the side of the window, the rest of the parts covered the thermometer from sunlight and precipitation. In 1862, the observatory building was dismantled. Since 1863, observations have been conducted from the Main Physical Observatory located opposite the Mining Building on the other side of the street. The observatory itself, where the observations were made, was a small wooden building 25 meters west of the main stone building of the Main Physical Observatory. The temperature was measured using psychrometers installed near the windows on both sides of the building — one before noon and the other after noon. The psychrometers were placed in tin boxes placed at a height of 2.3 m, measuring 48 x 25 x 24 cm with three solid side walls, a lid, and a bottom with holes in it. In 1867, the dimensions of the protective box were slightly increased, and the side walls were made in the form of blinds. In 1870, a thermograph and hygrograph were installed, which, together with a thermometer, were located 3.4 m above the ground in a zinc box with walls in the form of blinds. The box itself was located in a wooden booth measuring two by two meters and 2.5 m high, mounted on pillars 2.5 m high. The booth is open from below and on the north side, the roof and the south wall are solid, and the west and east walls are made in the form of blinds.; A pipe was arranged from the zinc box through the roof of the wooden booth, covered from above with an umbrella. From 1863 to 1869, air temperature measurements were again carried out every 2 hours; since 1870, they returned to hourly observations. Also in 1870, Russia switched to using the Celsius scale, before that thermometers with the Reaumur scale were used.

In 1933, the weather station from Vasilyevsky Island was transferred to Aptekarsky Island at 3 Dahl Street. In 1970, construction of the Leningrad Youth Palace began on the site of the weather station. And it was moved to a new location 300 meters southwest, at 48 Professor Popov Street, where the weather station is still located. The station's synoptic index is 26063. From 1883 to 1964, observations were conducted at the meteorological station at the Forestry Academy, and from 1878 to 1941 at the Pavlovsky Magnetic and Meteorological Observatory. Instead of the weather station in Pavlovsk, which was destroyed during the Great Patriotic War, a new weather station was opened in 1946 in the village of Voeikovo (index 26002) east of St. Petersburg. Since 1924, a weather station has been operating in the commercial seaport (index 26062), in 2017 it was downgraded to the status of a hydrological post; since 1975, a weather station at the Leningrad Hydrometeorological Institute began operating.

Currently, hydrometeorological observations are conducted according to a single international program and include measurements of temperature, air pressure and humidity, soil temperature, wind speed and direction, various characteristics of solar radiation, and precipitation. The distribution of pressure, wind, humidity and temperature at an altitude of up to 40 km is determined using radiosonde (in 1930, the first radiosonde was launched in Pavlovsk). Since 1968, observations have been made using meteorological radars. The observations have been supervised by the Hydrological Committee since 1903, and the Hydrological Institute since 1919. In 1929, the hydrological and meteorological services of the USSR were united and conduct unified hydrometeorological observations, based on their data, they provide the population, authorities and management with information about actual and expected hydrometeorological conditions. There are over 20 hydrometeorological stations in St. Petersburg and the Leningrad Region (including in St. Petersburg and nearby: on the Petrogradskaya side near the Palace of Youth (26063), in Kronstadt (26060), Roshchino (22896), Lisy Nos (22899), Lomonosov (26064), Pulkovo Airport (26065), Voeikovo (26002)).

== Literature ==
- Даринский А. В. (1975). Ленинградская область. Л: Лениздат.
- под ред. Ц. А. Швер, Е. В. Алтыкиса, Л. С. Евтеевой, ed. (1982). Климат Ленинграда (1350 ed.). Ленинград: Гидрометеоиздат. p. 254.
- Вильд, Генрих Иванович, ed. (1882). О температуре воздуха в Российской империи, на основании критического рассмотрения наблюдений, по предложению министра государственных имуществ, П. А. Валуева. Vol. Текст. С-Пб: Типография императорской академии наук. p. 360.
- Вильд, Генрих Иванович, ed. (1882). О температуре воздуха в Российской империи, на основании критического рассмотрения наблюдений, по предложению министра государственных имуществ, П. А. Валуева. Vol. Приложение. С-Пб: Типография императорской академии наук. p. 394.
