= Saint Petersburg Police =

Main Directorate of the Ministry of Internal Affairs of Russia for Saint Petersburg and Leningrad Oblast ГУ МВД России по г. Санкт-Петербургу и Ленинградской области Полиция Санкт-Петербурга
- Official logo of Saint Petersburg Police
- Common name: Saint Petersburg Police
- Abbreviation: GU MVD of Russia for Saint Petersburg and Leningrad Oblast
- Motto: Служим России, служим закону! We serve Russia, we serve the law!

Agency overview
- Formed: June 7, 1718; 308 years ago
- Employees: 9,000~

Jurisdictional structure
- Operations jurisdiction: Saint Petersburg and Leningrad Oblast, Russia
- Area: 85,939 square kilometres (33,181 mi^{2})
- Population: 4,848,700
- Legal jurisdiction: As per operations jurisdiction
- General nature: Local civilian police

Operational structure
- Overseen by: Government of Saint Petersburg, Government of Leningrad Oblast
- Headquarters: 191015, Saint Petersburg, Suvorov Prospekt, 50/52
- Police officers: 9,000 sworn officers (2015)
- Agency executive responsible: Roman Plugin, Commissioner of Saint Petersburg Police
- Parent agency: Ministry of Internal Affairs of Russia
- Units: List: Aviation Directorate; Crime Scene Unit; High-Crimes office; Central Investigation Department; Management of private security; Department of Economic Security and Anti-Corruption; Administration for the protection of public order and interaction with the executive authorities; Press service and information center; Mounted Police; Cultural center; Tourism Police; Directorate of accidents registration; Office of the State Inspection of Road Safety; Professional training center; Migratory Police; Pension Service Center; Drugs Enforcement Department
- District Police Departments: List: Boksitogorsky; Volosovsky; Volkhov; Vsevolozhsk; Vyborg; Gatchina; Kirishsk; Kirov; Kingisepp; Lodeinopol; Lomonosov; Luga; Podporozhsky; Priozersky; Slantsy; Sosnovy Bor; Tikhvin; Tosnensky

Facilities
- Commands: 19

Notables
- Anniversary: November 10
- Award: Lenin Order

Website
- 78.mvd.ru

The Saint Petersburg Police (Russian: полиция Санкт-Петербурга), officially the Main Directorate of the Ministry of Internal Affairs of Russia for Saint Petersburg and Leningrad Oblast (Russian: Главное управление МВД России по г. Санкт-Петербургу и Ленинградской области), is the state police authority of Saint Petersburg and Leningrad Oblast, Russia. The stated main responsibilities of the service are internal security, protection of human rights and freedoms, suppression and detection of crime, and protection of public order.

It is one of the oldest police services in Russia and the world, established on June 7, 1718, by Peter the Great as the municipal police for the city of Saint Petersburg. During the Soviet era, from 1924 the service was known as the Leningrad Militsiya (Russian: милиция Ленинграда) until 1991, when it was changed to Saint Petersburg Militsiya (Russian: милиция Санкт-Петербурга). The service adopted its current name in 2011 following reform in law enforcement agencies across Russia replacing the term "Militsiya" with "police".

The Saint Petersburg Police belongs to the Ministry of Internal Affairs, an agency of the Government of Russia but is primarily subordinate to the state governments of Saint Petersburg and Leningrad Oblast, respectively. The service is headed by a commissioner appointed by the governor of Saint Petersburg and is then confirmed by the Saint Petersburg Legislative Assembly on the recommendation of the president of Russia. The current Commissioner of Saint Petersburg Police since February 11, 2012, is Lieutenant-General Sergey Umnov.

== History ==
=== Tsarist era ===
The Saint Petersburg Police was established by Tsar Peter the Great on June 7, 1718, as the main municipal police force in Saint Petersburg, the capital of the Russian Empire which had been founded by Peter only fifteen years earlier. Anton de Vieira, a batman of Peter and mayor of Saint Petersburg at the time, was appointed as the first "Oberpolitzmeister" (a German, not Russian word: Senior Police Master), the title for the commander of the city police service. The department survived intact until 1917 during the February Revolution, when most of the Saint Petersburg Police remained loyal to the Imperial government. Several policemen were killed after the defection of the bulk of the city's army garrison to the revolution, especially when a rumor spread that the police were firing with machine guns from the roofs of buildings.

=== Soviet and post-Soviet periods ===
Shortly after the overthrow of the Imperial government, the department was formally disbanded. Following the October Revolution, a new Soviet police force was established under the title of Militsiya, which replaced the functions of the Saint Petersburg Police. In 1924, following the renaming of Saint Petersburg to Leningrad in honor of Vladimir Lenin, the city police were known as the Leningrad Militsiya (Russian: милицию Ленинграда. This name continued until 1991, shortly after the dissolution of the Soviet Union, when it was changed to Saint Petersburg Militsiya (милицию Санкт-Петербурга) after the name of the city was reverted. The service adopted its current name on March 1, 2011, as part of wider law enforcement legislative reform backed by Russian president Dmitry Medvedev, which abandoned the usage of the term "Militsiya" in favor of the re-adoption of "Politsiya" (police) in law enforcement agencies across Russia.

== Organization and structure ==
=== Organization ===
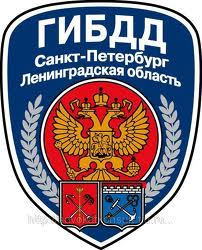
Saint Petersburg's Traffic Police badge

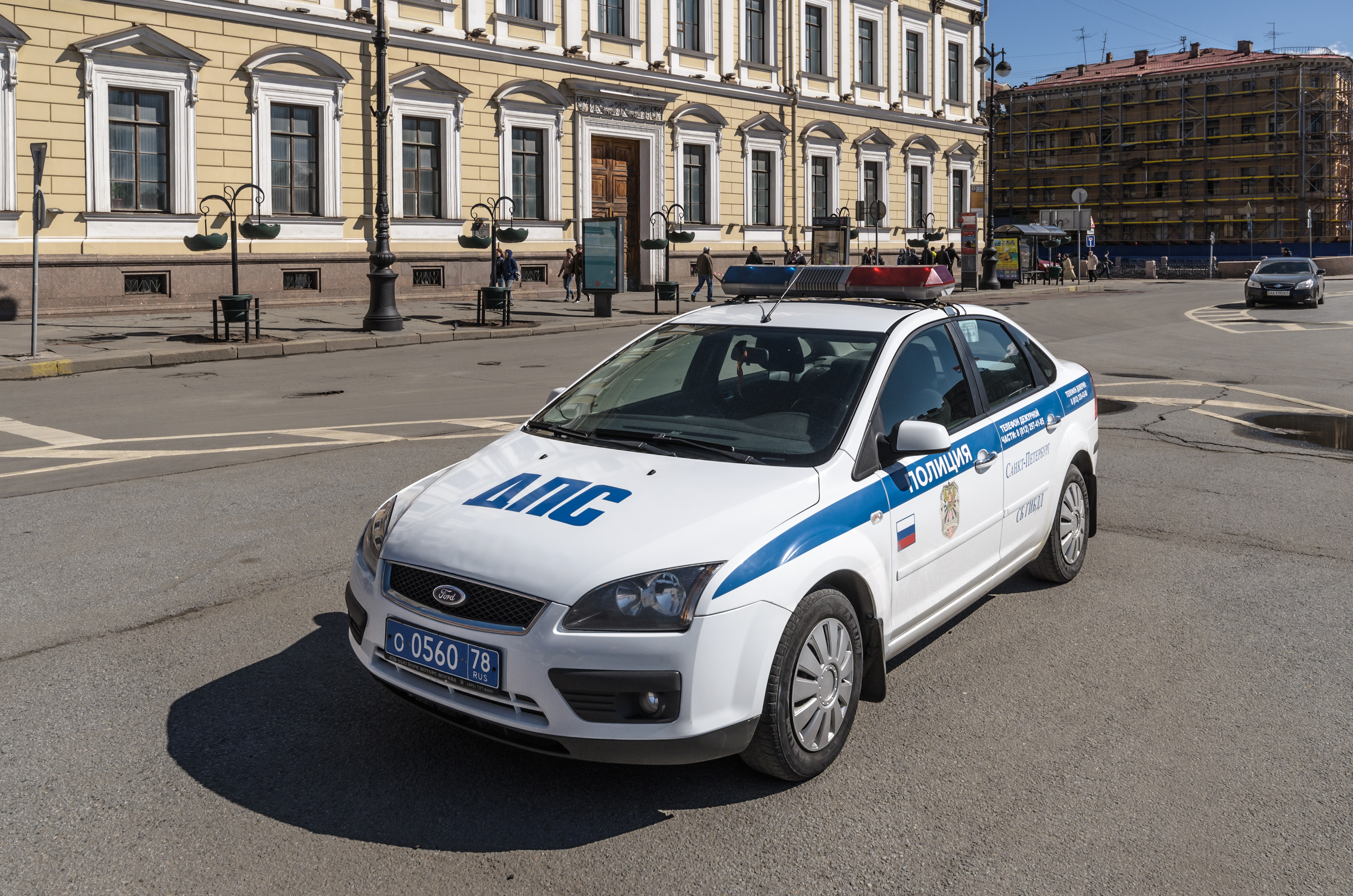
Saint Petersburg Police Ford Focus patrol car near Saint Isaac's Cathedral.

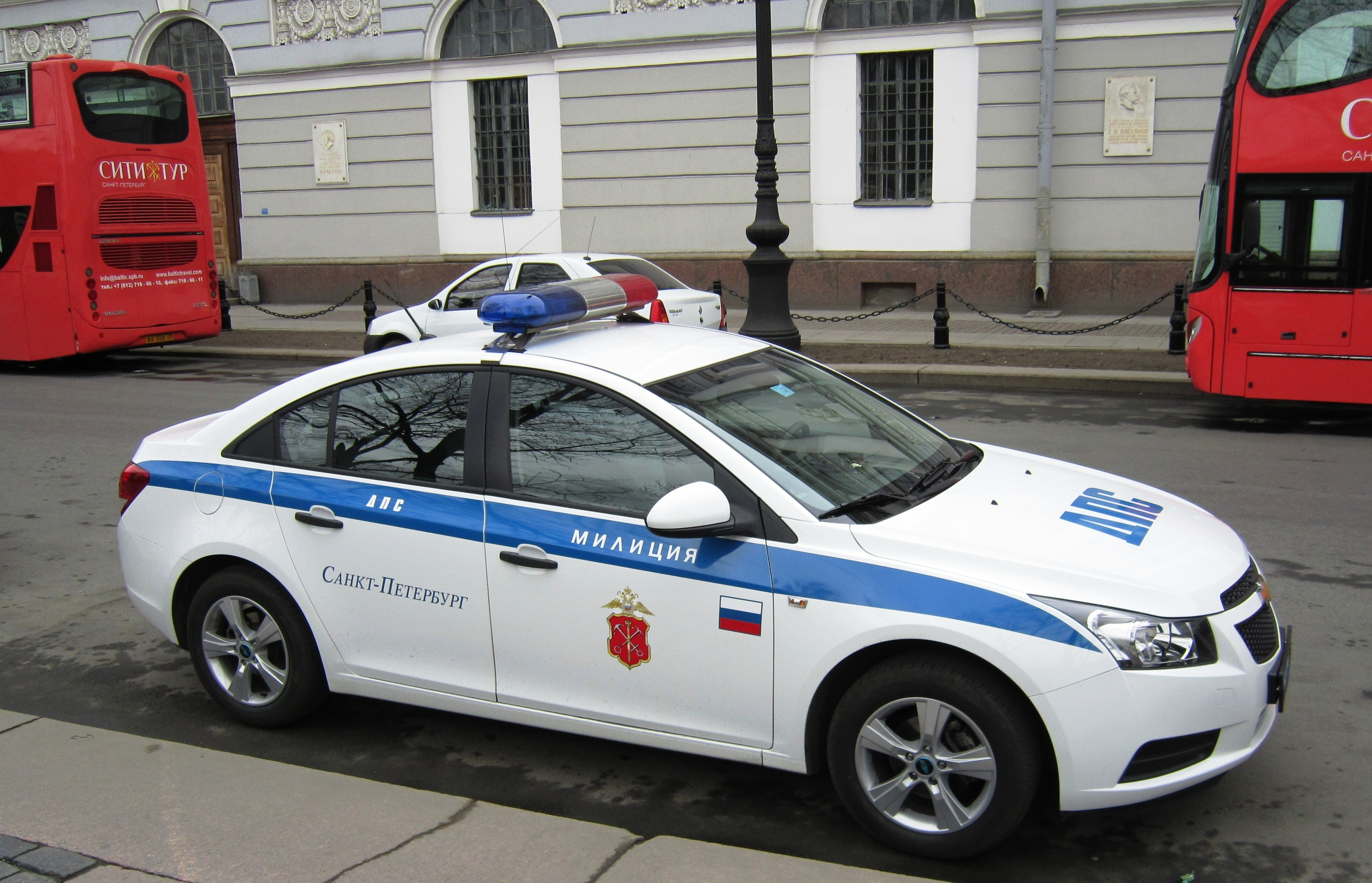
Saint Petersburg Police Chevrolet Cruze, April 2011

- Tourism Police (The St. Petersburg Tourist Police; туристическая полиция) was established in 2011 as a single law enforcement agency for crimes committed against tourists and is responsible for assisting visitors to the city. The Tourist Police was given responsibility for undertaking these roles by the regional branch of the Russian Tourism Ministry.
- The River Police of St. Petersburg – The River Police of St. Petersburg (Речная полиция Санкт-Петербурга) was a unique law enforcement body that was responsible for supervision over the waters of the rivers in Saint Petersburg and the body was subordinate to the city police commissioner. The River Police Force was established in 1866.
- Central Investigation Department (The Detective Police of St. Petersburg; Сыскная полиция Санкт-Петербурга) was established in 1714 and was the first of its kind in Russia. In 1880, the detective police were replaced by the Capital Department of the Okhrana. Since 1918, the function of investigating crime in the city has been performed by the Main Criminal Investigations Directorate.
- Aviation Directorate
- Crime Scene Unit
- High-Crimes office
- Management of private security
- Department of Economic Security and Anti-Corruption
- Mounted Police
- OMON – Special Response Unit
- Directorate of accidents registration
- Office of the State Inspection of Road Safety (Traffic Police)
- Administration for the protection of public order and interaction with the executive authorities
- Press service and information center
- Cultural center
- Pension Service Center
- Professional training center
- Federal Migratory Police (Official Website)
- Main Directorate for Drugs Control

=== District Police Departments ===
Districts of St. Petersburg: 1. Admiralteysky 2. Vasileostrovsky 3. Vyborgsky 4. Kalininsky 5. Kirovsky 6. Kolpinsky 7. Krasnogvardeysky 8. Krasnoselsky 9. Kronshtadtsky 10. Kurortny 11. Moskovsky 12. Nevsky 13. Petrogradsky 14. Petrodvortsovy 15. Primorsky 16. Pushkinsky 17. Frunzensky 18. Tsentralny

== Saint Petersburg Police Commissioner ==
The commissioner of the Saint Petersburg Police, officially Head of Internal Affairs of Saint Petersburg, is a commissioner with authority as the head of the service, responsible for the day-to-day operation of the department as well as the appointment of deputies and subordinate officers. The commissioner is a policeman administrator appointed by the appointed by the governor of Saint Petersburg, confirmed after the approval of the Saint Petersburg Legislative Assembly by recommendation of the president of Russia, and serves indefinitely at the governor's will. The position is sometimes mistaken as the chief of police, which is separate from the Saint Petersburg Police and the holder of which serves as the deputy to the head of internal affairs.

The current commissioner is Lieutenant-General Roman Plugin, who was appointed by Governor Aleksander Beglov and took office in 2019. The longest-serving commissioner is Aleksander Sokolov, who served as commissioner of the Leningrad Militsiya for 10 years (1962–1972), under mayors Vasily Isayev and Aleksandr Sizov.

Police Commissioner of the City of Saint Petersburg
- Incumbent; Roman Plugin since February 2019
- Style: The Honorable
- Appointer: Governor of Saint Petersburg
- Term length: Five years; Renewable at the Governor's pleasure
- Constituting instrument: Saint Petersburg Charter
- Inaugural holder: Anton de Vieira (as Chief of St Petersburg Police)
- Formation: 1718
- Deputy: Deputy of Chief of Police
- Website: Management

=== List of heads of Main Interior Affairs Dept. of Saint Petersburg and Leningrad Oblast ===
- Arkady Kramarev (1990–1994)
- Yuri Loskutov (1994–1996)
- Anatoly Ponidelko (1996–1998)
- Victor Vlasov (June 1998 – November 1999)
- Benjamin Petukhov (1999–2002)
- Mikhail Vanichkin (2002–2006)
- Vladislav Piotrovsky (2006–2011)
- Mikhail Sukhodolsky (2011–2012)
- Sergey Umnov (2012–2019)
- Roman Plugin (Since February 28, 2019)

=== Former positions ===
==== Oberpolitzmeister of Saint Petersburg ====
The position of Commissioner can be traced back to the position of Oberpolitzmeister, meaning "Chief master of the police" in German, created by Tsar Peter the Great when he founded the Saint Petersburg Police in 1718 to take charge of the day-to-day operation of the service.

===== List of Oberpolitzmeisters of Saint Petersburg =====
- Anton de Vieira (1718–1745), while serving as Mayor of Saint Petersburg
- Christoph von Münnich (1731–1732)
- Vasily Saltykov (1732–1740)
- Fyodor Naumov (1740–1744)
- Alexei Tatischev (1745–1760)
- Nikolai Corff (1760–1766)
- Nikolai Chicherin (1764–1778)
- Dmitry Volkov (1778–1782)
- Nikita Riliev (1784–1794)
- Fyodor Trepov (1866–1873)
- Alexander Kozlov (1881–1882)
- Peter Gresser (1882–1883)

===== List of commissioners of the Leningrad Militsiya =====
- Clement Voroshilov (1917–1918)
- Aleksandr Sokolov (1962–1972)

== In popular culture ==
- Petersburg Gangsters (Бандитский Петербург) depicts conflict between the Saint Petersburg Police and local criminals.
- Liteiniy, 4 (Литейный, 4) is centered on a special unit in the Saint Petersburg Police located on Liteyny Avenue. The title of the show is a reference to the address of Bolshoy Dom, the Saint Petersburg headquarters of the Ministry of Internal Affairs.
- Deadly Force (Убойная сила) starring Konstantin Khabensky, one of the most popular TV series about Saint Petersburg Police, was aired on Channel One since 2000 til 2005, for 6 seasons and 57 episodes. Alongside this series, was another TV Show about local police called Streets of Broken Lights (Улицы разбитых фонарей) which was aired for 15 seasons and 433 episodes, from 1998 til 2014.
- Opera. Homicide's Chronicles (Опера. Хроники убойного отдела) which aired first on Russia-1 in November 2004.

== See also ==
- Politsiya - the federal police service of Russia.
- Militsiya
- Moscow Police
- List of law enforcement agencies
