= Aptekarsky Ostrov =

Aptekarsky Ostrov (Russian: Аптекарский остров) may refer to:

- Aptekarsky Island (Aptekarsky ostrov), an island on the Neva River in St. Petersburg, Russia
- Aptekarsky Ostrov Municipal Okrug, a municipal okrug of Petrogradsky District of the federal city of St. Petersburg, Russia
