= Ilshat Kuzikov =

Russian serial killer (born 1960)

- Ильшат Кузиков
- Born: 27 February 1960 (age 66); Leninabad, Tajik SSR, Soviet Union
- Conviction: Murder (3 counts)
- Penalty: Compulsory treatment

Details
- Victims: 3+
- Span of crimes: 1992 – 1995 (claimed); 1994 – 1995 (confirmed)
- Country: Russian Federation
- Date apprehended: 25 August 1995

Ilshat Kuzikov (Russian: Ильшат Кузиков; born 27 February 1960) is a Tajik-born Russian serial killer and cannibal who murdered a minimum of three male acquaintances in his apartment in Saint Petersburg between 1994 and 1995; however, he claimed to have begun in 1992.

== Early life ==
Kuzikov was born in 1960 in the Tajik SSR. He was reported to have had an unstable youth. His father frequently abused his mother, eventually causing her death from injuries sustained in 1973. After the incident, Kuzikov and his brother were adopted by their aunt. Kuzikov claimed to have lost compassion after her death and no longer felt disgust at the sight of blood.

Kuzikov later studied as a welder and, at age 20, moved to Vyborg for military service. Shortly after, in 1982, he committed his first known crime when he attacked a colleague with a wrench. He avoided legal punishment after being diagnosed with schizophrenia. After undergoing forced treatment, he moved into an apartment in Saint Petersburg (then Leningrad), where he began a short-lived marriage.

== Murders and arrest ==
After his marriage failed, Kuzikov began to spend time with local homeless people and acquaintances from the hospital he was previously treated in, often inviting them to his apartment to drink vodka.

In 1995, locals in Moskovsky District began finding body parts thrown into garbage around the area. Investigators were quickly led to Kuzikov, who left blood in the stairwell outside of his apartment, which neighbours complained was omitting a rotten smell. In his poorly furnished apartment, police discovered dried human skin and buckets of cooked human flesh. Kuzikov claimed to have killed them because he was too poor to afford enough food with his US$20 monthly pension and that each victim was murdered and dismembered in his bathroom. Contemporary newspapers claimed that he was a homosexual, engaged in bestiality, and killed his victims for refusing to engage in sexual acts.

Kuzikov would be connected to a minimum of three murders, though due to the quantity of meat in his apartment, he was suspected of committing several more. In March 1997, he was sentenced to compulsory treatment at a psychiatric hospital along the Arsenalnaya embankment in Saint Petersburg.

== See also ==
- Eduard Seleznev
- List of incidents of cannibalism
- List of Russian serial killers
