= Municipal Okrug 75 =

Municipal Okrug 75 муниципальный округ № 75
- Municipal okrug
- Coordinates: 59°51′N 30°24′E
- Country: Russia
- Federal city: St. Petersburg

Population (2010 Census)
  - Total: 59,277
- Website: mo75.ru

Municipal Okrug 75 (Russian: Муниципальный округ № 75) is a municipal okrug in Frunzensky District, one of the eighty-one low-level municipal divisions of the federal city of St. Petersburg, Russia. As of the 2010 Census, its population was 50,757.

== Overview ==
The western part of the district, adjacent to Bukharestskaya street, is occupied by multi-storey residential buildings. In the eastern part there is an industrial zone, as well as a cemetery "In memory of the victims of January 9".

Public transport is represented by a tram line along Bucharest Street, as well as bus routes. Obukhovo metro station and Obukhovo railway station are located near the eastern border of the district.
