= Kronverksky =

Kronverksky (masculine), Kronverkskaya (feminine), or Kronverkskoye (neuter) may refer to:

- Kronverksky Strait, a narrow strait separating Petrogradsky and Zayachy Islands in St. Petersburg, Russia
- Kronverkskoye Municipal Okrug, a municipal okrug of Petrogradsky District of the federal city of St. Petersburg, Russia
- Kronverksky Avenue, an avenue in St. Petersburg, Russia, where the city services building completed by architect Marian Peretyatkovich is located
