= Sapyorny =

Sapyorny (masculine), Sapyornaya (feminine), or Sapyornoye (neuter) may refer to:

- Sapyorny, Saint Petersburg, a municipal settlement under jurisdiction of Saint Petersburg, Russia
- Sapyornoye, a rural locality in Leningrad Oblast, Russia
