= Metallostroy =

Municipal settlement in St. Petersburg, Russia

Coordinates: 59.8°N 30.55°E

Flag of Melallostroy

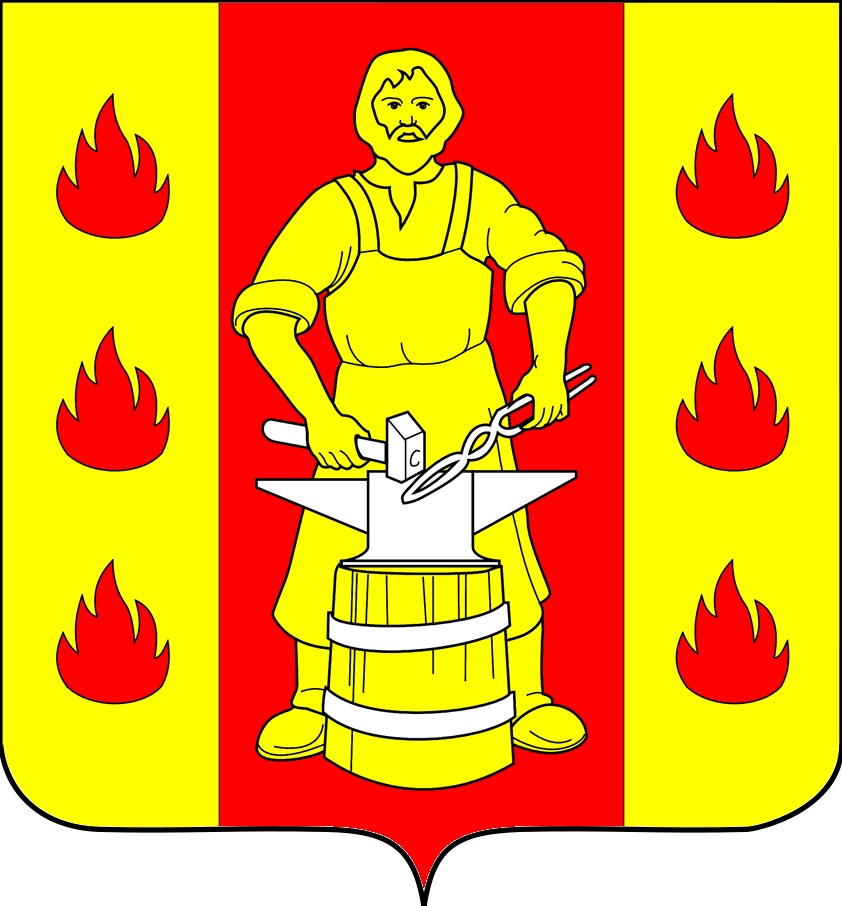
Coat of arms of Melallostroy

Metallostroy (Russian: Металлостро́й) is a municipal settlement in Kolpinsky District of the federal city of St. Petersburg, Russia. Population: 26,361 (2010 census); 25,675 (2002 census); 22,940 (1989 Soviet census).

== History ==
It was established in 1931 as a settlement for workers building Kolpino Metal Factory, which explains the name of the township, its first part meaning metal, and stroy meaning construction.

First houses started to appear in the spring of 1932. The settlement was officially named Metallostroy on October 28, 1964.

== Transportation ==
Metallostroy is passed through in two directions by train. Moscow and Volkhovstroy, in these areas located on the platform of Metallostroy and platform Izhors (Ижоры), respectively. Almost directly in the center of Metallostroy is a platform of Izhors. The village has a lot of bus routes, both a target and transit. These routes connect the settlement with stations of the Petersburg underground Rybatskoye, Proletarskaya and Lomonosovskaya, and as with all parts of the Kolpino District, the cities of Otradnoye on the Neva, Nikolskoye and Kirovsk.
