= Alexandrovskaya, Saint Petersburg =

Municipal settlement in St. Petersburg, Russia

Coordinates: 59°43′53″N 30°20′53″E

Alexandrovskaya (Russian: Александровская) is a municipal settlement in Pushkinsky District of the federal city of St. Petersburg, Russia. Population: 2,491 (2010 census); 1,184 (2002 census); 2,960 (1989 Soviet census).
