= Vvedensky Municipal Okrug =

Municipal okrug in Petrogradsky District, Russia

Vvedensky Municipal Okrug on the 2006 map of St. Petersburg

Vvedensky Municipal Okrug (Russian: Введе́нский муниципа́льный о́круг), formerly Municipal Okrug #58 (муниципа́льный о́круг № 58), is a municipal okrug of Petrogradsky District of the federal city of St. Petersburg, Russia. Population: 19,778 (2010 census); 21,374 (2002 census).

The okrug borders Bolshoy Avenue in the north, Vvdenskaya Street in the east, Kronverksky Avenue in the southeast, and Malaya Neva in the southwest.
