= Gavan Municipal Okrug =

Coordinates: 59°56′N 30°14′E

Gavan Municipal Okrug муниципальный округ Гавань
- Municipal okrug
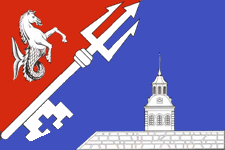
- Flag

- Gavan Municipal Okrug on the 2006 map of St. Petersburg
- Country: Russia
- Federal city: St. Petersburg

Population (2010 Census)
  - Total: 35,927
- Website: http://www.mogavan.ru

Gavan Municipal Okrug (Russian: муниципа́льный о́круг Гавань) is a municipal okrug in Vasileostrovsky District, one of the eighty-one low-level municipal divisions of the federal city of St. Petersburg, Russia. As of the 2010 Census, its population was 35,927, up from 35,766 recorded during the 2002 Census.
