= Smolyachkovo =

Municipal settlement in St. Petersburg, Russia

Coordinates: 60.18°N 29.46°E

Smolyachkovo on the 2006 map of St. Petersburg

Smolyachkovo (Russian: Смолячково; Finnish: Lautaranta) is a municipal settlement in Kurortny District of the federal city of St. Petersburg, Russia, located on the Karelian Isthmus on the northern shore of the Gulf of Finland. Population: 610 (2010 census); 568 (2002 census).

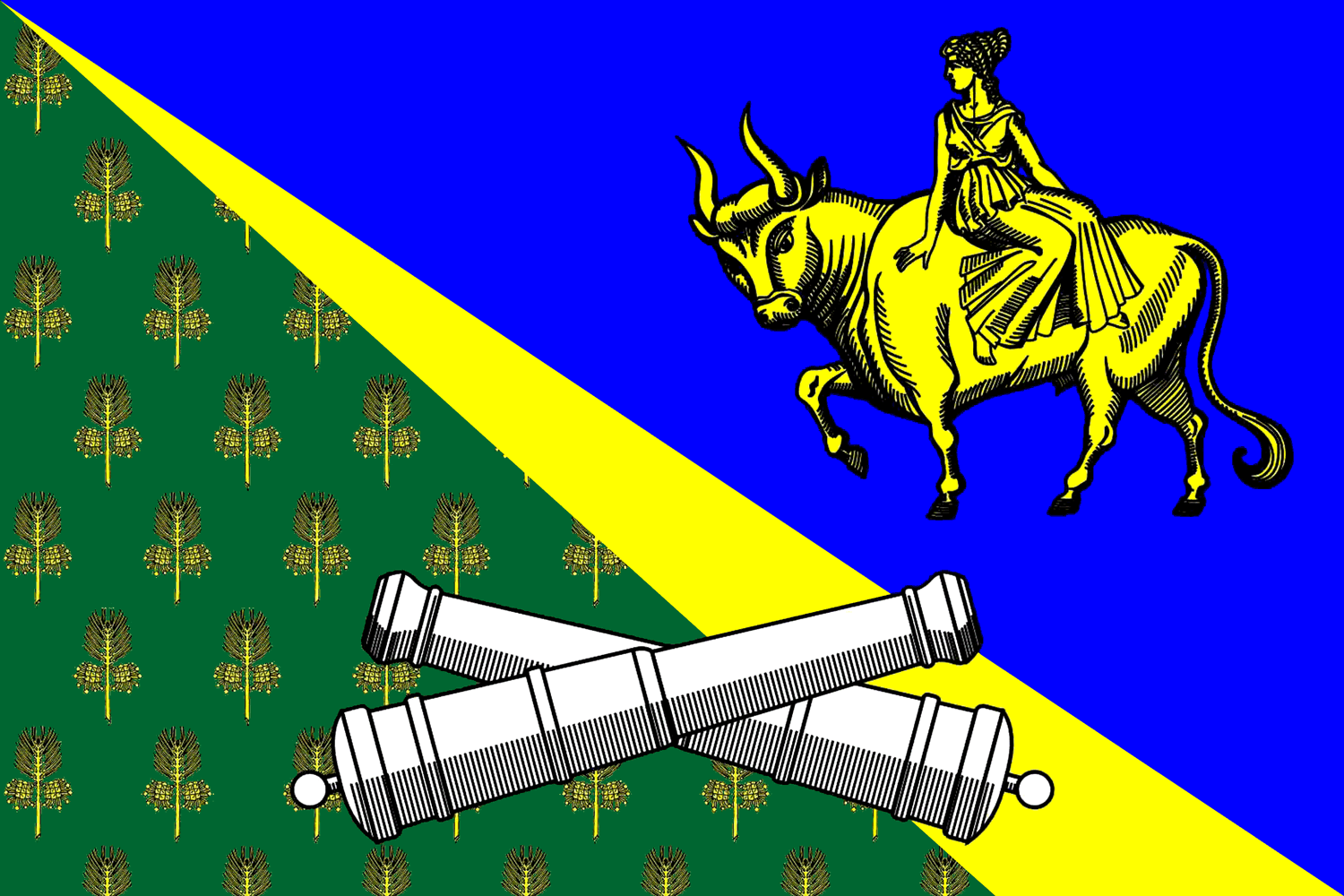
The flag of Smolyachkovo

Before Winter War and Continuation War it was part of Finland in the municipality of Uusikirkko.
