= Municipal Okrug 72 =

Municipal Okrug 72 муниципальный округ № 72
- Municipal okrug
- Coordinates: 59°54′N 30°16′E
- Country: Russia
- Federal city: St. Petersburg

Population (2010 Census)
  - Total: 68,333
- Website: http://mo72.ru/

Municipal Okrug 72 (Russian: Муниципальный округ № 72) is a municipal okrug in Frunzensky District, one of the eighty-one low-level municipal divisions of the federal city of St. Petersburg, Russia. As of the 2010 Census, its population was 68,333.

== Boundary ==
In the north along Bela Kuna street with 71 municipal district of St. Petersburg (Volkovskoe) while in the east lies along the Moscow line of the railway with the Nevsky district. In the south lies along the Yuzhnoye highway with the 75th municipal district of St. Petersburg while in the west along Bukharestskaya street with municipal district No. 73 (Kupchino)
