= Administrative divisions of Saint Petersburg =

Division of St. Petersburg to boroughs

Federal city of Saint Petersburg Russia

Administrative structure (as of 2014)
- Districts: 18
- Cities/towns: 9
- Urban-type settlements: 21
- Selsovets: 81

Municipal structure (as of 2002)
- Rural settlements: ? (inhabited) ? (uninhabited)

Districts of St. Petersburg: 1. Admiralteysky 2. Vasileostrovsky 3. Vyborgsky 4. Kalininsky 5. Kirovsky 6. Kolpinsky 7. Krasnogvardeysky 8. Krasnoselsky 9. Kronshtadtsky 10. Kurortny 11. Moskovsky 12. Nevsky 13. Petrogradsky 14. Petrodvortsovy 15. Primorsky 16. Pushkinsky 17. Frunzensky 18. Tsentralny

The federal city of Saint Petersburg, Russia, is divided into eighteen rayony ("districts", Russian: районы, singular: rayon), which are in turn subdivided into municipal okrugs, municipal towns, and municipal settlements.

== Admiralteysky District ==
Name	Structure	OKTMO	Population	Photos
Admiralteysky District (Адмиралтейский район)	city district	—N/a	187,837	The Admiralty building is located in Admiralteysky Municipal Okrug
Kolomna (Коломна)	municipal okrug	40 301	37,642	The Admiralty building is located in Admiralteysky Municipal Okrug
Sennoy (Сенной)	municipal okrug	40 302	28,105	The Admiralty building is located in Admiralteysky Municipal Okrug
Admiralteysky (Адмиралтейский)	municipal okrug	40 303	30,533	The Admiralty building is located in Admiralteysky Municipal Okrug
Semyonovsky (Семёновский)	municipal okrug	40 304	29,572	The Admiralty building is located in Admiralteysky Municipal Okrug
Izmaylovskoye (Измайловское)	municipal okrug	40 305	30,415	The Admiralty building is located in Admiralteysky Municipal Okrug
Yekateringofsky (Екатерингофский)	municipal okrug	40 306	31,570	The Admiralty building is located in Admiralteysky Municipal Okrug

== Frunzensky District ==
Name	Structure	OKTMO	Population
Frunzensky District (Фрунзенский район)	city district	—N/a	405,274
Volkovskoye (Волковское)	municipal okrug	40 902	60,082
#72 (№ 72)	municipal okrug	40 903	69,785
Kupchino (Купчино)	municipal okrug	40 904	62,673
Georgiyevsky (Георгиевский)	municipal okrug	40 905	92,780
#75 (№ 75)	municipal okrug	40 906	44,498
Balkansky (Балканский)	municipal okrug	40 907	75,456

== Kalininsky District ==
Name	Structure	OKTMO	Population	Photos
Kalininsky District (Калининский район)	city district	—N/a	469,409	Kalininsky District administration building
Grazhdanka (Гражданка)	municipal okrug	40 328	74,009	Kalininsky District administration building
Akademicheskoye (Академическое)	municipal okrug	40 329	93,535	Kalininsky District administration building
Finlyandsky (Финляндский)	municipal okrug	40 330	53,916	Kalininsky District administration building
#21 (№ 21)	municipal okrug	40 331	72,403	Kalininsky District administration building
Piskaryovka (Пискарёвка)	municipal okrug	40 332	59,004	Kalininsky District administration building
Severny (Северный)	municipal okrug	40 333	51,605	Kalininsky District administration building
Prometey (Прометей)	municipal okrug	40 334	64,937	Kalininsky District administration building

== Kirovsky District ==
Name	Structure	OKTMO	Population	Photos
Kirovsky District (Кировский район)	city district	—N/a	338,820	Kirovsky District administration building
Knyazhevo (Княжево)	municipal okrug	40 335	60,036	Kirovsky District administration building
Ulyanka (Ульянка)	municipal okrug	40 336	75,533	Kirovsky District administration building
Dachnoye (Дачное)	municipal okrug	40 337	76,229	Kirovsky District administration building
Avtovo (Автово)	municipal okrug	40 338	49,022	Kirovsky District administration building
Narvsky (Нарвский)	municipal okrug	40 339	29,822	Kirovsky District administration building
Krasnenkaya Rechka (Красненькая Речка)	municipal okrug	40 340	37,891	Kirovsky District administration building
Morskiye Vorota (Морские Ворота)	municipal okrug	40 341	10,287	Kirovsky District administration building

== Kolpinsky District ==
Name	Structure	OKTMO	Population
Kolpinsky District (Колпинский район)	city district	—N/a	175,396
Kolpino (Колпино)	municipal town	40 342	136,632
Metallostroy (Металлострой)	municipal settlement	40 343	25,675
Petro-Slavyanka (Петро-Славянка)	municipal settlement	40 344	1,337
Pontonny (Понтонный)	municipal settlement	40 345	9,199
Sapyorny (Сапёрный)	municipal settlement	40 346	1,401
Ust-Izhora (Усть-Ижора)	municipal settlement	40 347	1,152

== Krasnogvardeysky District ==
Name	Structure	OKTMO	Population
Krasnogvardeysky District (Красногвардейский район)	city district	—N/a	336,342
Polyustrovo (Полюстрово)	municipal okrug	40 348	51,529
Bolshaya Okhta (Большая Охта)	municipal okrug	40 349	56,648
Malaya Okhta (Малая Охта)	municipal okrug	40 350	48,627
Porokhovye (Пороховые)	municipal okrug	40 351	123,583
Rzhevka (Ржевка)	municipal okrug	40 352	55,955

== Krasnoselsky District ==
Name	Structure	OKTMO	Population
Krasnoselsky District (Красносельский район)	city district	—N/a	305,129
Krasnoye Selo (Красное Село)	municipal town	40 353	44,081
Yugo-Zapad (Юго-Запад)	municipal okrug	40 354	64,261
Yuzhno-Primorsky (Южно-Приморский)	municipal okrug	40 355	50,610
Sosnovaya Polyana (Сосновая Поляна)	municipal okrug	40 356	45,742
Uritsk (Урицк)	municipal okrug	40 357	49,049
Konstantinovskoye (Константиновское)	municipal okrug	40 358	34,747
Gorelovo (Горелово)	municipal okrug	40 359	16,640

== Kronshtadtsky District ==
Name	Structure	OKTMO	Population
Kronshtadtsky District (Кронштадтский район)	city district	—N/a	43,385
Kronshtadt (Кронштадт)	municipal town	40 360	43,385

== Kurortny District ==
Name	Structure	OKTMO	Population
Kurortny District (Курортный район)	city district	—N/a	67,511
Zelenogorsk (Зеленогорск)	municipal town	40 361	12,074
Sestroretsk (Сестрорецк)	municipal town	40 362	40,287
Beloostrov (Белоостров)	municipal settlement	40 363	1,690
Komarovo (Комарово)	municipal settlement	40 364	1,062
Molodyozhnoye (Молодёжное)	municipal settlement	40 365	1,437
Pesochny (Песочный)	municipal settlement	40 366	6,487
Repino (Репино)	municipal settlement	40 367	2,011
Serovo (Серово)	municipal settlement	40 368	252
Smolyachkovo (Смолячково)	municipal settlement	40 369	568
Solnechnoye (Солнечное)	municipal settlement	40 370	1,161
Ushkovo (Ушково)	municipal settlement	40 371	482

== Moskovsky District ==
Name	Structure	OKTMO	Population	Photos
Moskovsky District (Московский район)	city district	—N/a	275,884	Moskovsky District administration building
Moskovskaya zastava (Московская застава)	municipal okrug	40 373	46,951	Moskovsky District administration building
Gagarinskoye (Гагаринское)	municipal okrug	40 374	58,197	Moskovsky District administration building
Novoizmaylovskoye (Новоизмайловское)	municipal okrug	40 375	70,403	Moskovsky District administration building
Pulkovsky meridian (Пулковский меридиан)	municipal okrug	40 376	46,515	Moskovsky District administration building
Zvyozdnoye (Звёздное)	municipal okrug	40 377	53,818	Moskovsky District administration building

== Nevsky District ==
Name	Structure	OKTMO	Population
Nevsky District (Невский район)	city district	—N/a	438,061
Nevskaya Zastava (Невская Застава)	municipal okrug	40 378	29,685
Ivanovsky (Ивановский)	municipal okrug	40 379	31,215
Obukhovsky (Обуховский)	municipal okrug	40 380	46,108
Rybatskoye (Рыбацкое)	municipal okrug	40 381	49,537
Narodny (Народный)	municipal okrug	40 382	52,580
#54 (№ 54)	municipal okrug	40 383	63,138
Nevsky (Невский)	municipal okrug	40 384	59,714
Okkervil (Оккервиль)	municipal okrug	40 385	55,078
Pravoberezhny (Правобережный)	municipal okrug	40 386	51,006

== Petrodvortsovy District ==
Name	Structure	OKTMO	Population	Photos
Petrodvortsovy District (Петродворцовый район)	city district	—N/a	77,542	Fountains in Petergof
Lomonosov (Ломоносов)	municipal town	40 372	37,776	Fountains in Petergof
Petergof (Петергоф)	municipal town	40 395	64,791	Fountains in Petergof
Strelna (Стрельна)	municipal settlement	40 396	12,751	Fountains in Petergof

== Petrogradsky District ==
Name	Structure	OKTMO	Population	Photos
Petrogradsky District (Петроградский район)	city district	—N/a	134,607	Peter and Paul Fortress
Vvedensky (Введенский)	municipal okrug	40 389	21,374	Peter and Paul Fortress
Kronverkskoye (Кронверкское)	municipal okrug	40 390	21,256	Peter and Paul Fortress
Posadsky (Посадский)	municipal okrug	40 391	21,630	Peter and Paul Fortress
Aptekarsky Ostrov (Аптекарский Остров)	municipal okrug	40 392	19,277	Peter and Paul Fortress
Petrovsky (Петровский)	municipal okrug	40 393	20,808	Peter and Paul Fortress
Chkalovskoye (Чкаловское)	municipal okrug	40 394	30,262	Peter and Paul Fortress

== Primorsky District ==
Name	Structure	OKTMO	Population	Photos
Primorsky District (Приморский район)	city district	—N/a	393,960	View to Primorsky District
Lisy Nos (Лисий Нос)	municipal settlement	40 320	2,563	View to Primorsky District
Lakhta-Olgino (Лахта-Ольгино)	municipal okrug	40 321	2,901	View to Primorsky District
#65 (№ 65)	municipal okrug	40 322	83,952	View to Primorsky District
Chyornaya rechka (Чёрная речка)	municipal okrug	40 323	53,717	View to Primorsky District
Komendantsky Aerodrom (Комендантский Аэродром)	municipal okrug	40 324	71,968	View to Primorsky District
Ozero Dolgoye (Озеро Долгое)	municipal okrug	40 325	78,714	View to Primorsky District
Yuntolovo (Юнтолово)	municipal okrug	40 326	74,382	View to Primorsky District
Kolomyagi (Коломяги)	municipal okrug	40 327	25,763	View to Primorsky District

== Pushkinsky District ==
Name	Structure	OKTMO	Population	Photos
Pushkinsky District (Пушкинский район)	city district	—N/a	101,655	Catherine Palace in Pushkin
Pavlovsk (Павловск)	municipal town	40 387	14,960	Catherine Palace in Pushkin
Tyarlevo (Тярлево)	municipal settlement	40 388	1,556	Catherine Palace in Pushkin
Pushkin (Пушкин)	municipal town	40 397	84,628	Catherine Palace in Pushkin
Alexandrovskaya (Александровская)	municipal settlement	40 398	1,184	Catherine Palace in Pushkin
Shushary (Шушары)	municipal settlement	40 901	15,843	Catherine Palace in Pushkin

== Tsentralny District ==
Name	Structure	OKTMO	Population	Photos
Tsentralny District (Центральный район)	city district	—N/a	236,856	Palace Square in Dvortsovy Municipal Okrug
Dvortsovy (Дворцовый)	municipal okrug	40 908	10,491	Palace Square in Dvortsovy Municipal Okrug
#78 (№ 78)	municipal okrug	40 909	13,508	Palace Square in Dvortsovy Municipal Okrug
Liteyny (Литейный)	municipal okrug	40 910	50,567	Palace Square in Dvortsovy Municipal Okrug
Smolninskoye (Смольнинское)	municipal okrug	40 911	90,337	Palace Square in Dvortsovy Municipal Okrug
Ligovka-Yamskaya (Лиговка-Ямская)	municipal okrug	40 912	14,740	Palace Square in Dvortsovy Municipal Okrug
Vladimirsky (Владимирский)	municipal okrug	40 913	57,213	Palace Square in Dvortsovy Municipal Okrug

== Vasileostrovsky District ==
Name	Structure	OKTMO	Population	Photos
Vasileostrovsky District (Василеостровский район)	city district	—N/a	199,692	The spit of Vasilyevsky Island
#7 (№ 7)	municipal okrug	40 307	45,696	The spit of Vasilyevsky Island
Vasilyevsky (Васильевский)	municipal okrug	40 308	32,793	The spit of Vasilyevsky Island
Gavan (Гавань)	municipal okrug	40 309	35,766	The spit of Vasilyevsky Island
Morskoy (Морской)	municipal okrug	40 310	31,555	The spit of Vasilyevsky Island
Ostrov Dekabristov (Остров Декабристов)	municipal okrug	40 311	53,882	The spit of Vasilyevsky Island

== Vyborgsky District ==
Name	Structure	OKTMO	Population
Vyborgsky District (Выборгский район)	city district	—N/a	419,567
Levashovo (Левашово)	municipal settlement	40 312	4,095
Pargolovo (Парголово)	municipal settlement	40 313	12,225
Sampsoniyevskoye (Сампсониевское)	municipal okrug	40 314	39,250
Svetlanovskoye (Светлановское)	municipal okrug	40 315	83,782
Sosnovskoye (Сосновское)	municipal okrug	40 316	60,675
#15 (№ 15)	municipal okrug	40 317	64,320
Sergiyevskoye (Сергиевское)	municipal okrug	40 318	67,709
Shuvalovo-Ozerki (Шувалово-Озерки)	municipal okrug	40 319	87,511

== See also ==
- Saint Petersburg City Administration
