= Pontonny =

Municipal settlement in St. Petersburg, Russia

Coordinates: 59°47′9″N 30°38′2″E

Pontonny (Russian: Понто́нный) is a municipal settlement in Kolpinsky District of the federal city of St. Petersburg, Russia. Population: 8,291 (2010 census); 9,199 (2002 census); 10,895 (1989 Soviet census).

== Geography ==
The locality is located in the East of the Kolpinsky district of Saint Petersburg on the left Bank of the Neva river, about 10 km from the Rybatskoye metro station and 13 km from the ring road . The area of the settlement is 8 square kilometers, the population as of 2019 is 9105 permanently registered residents.

== Economy and industry ==
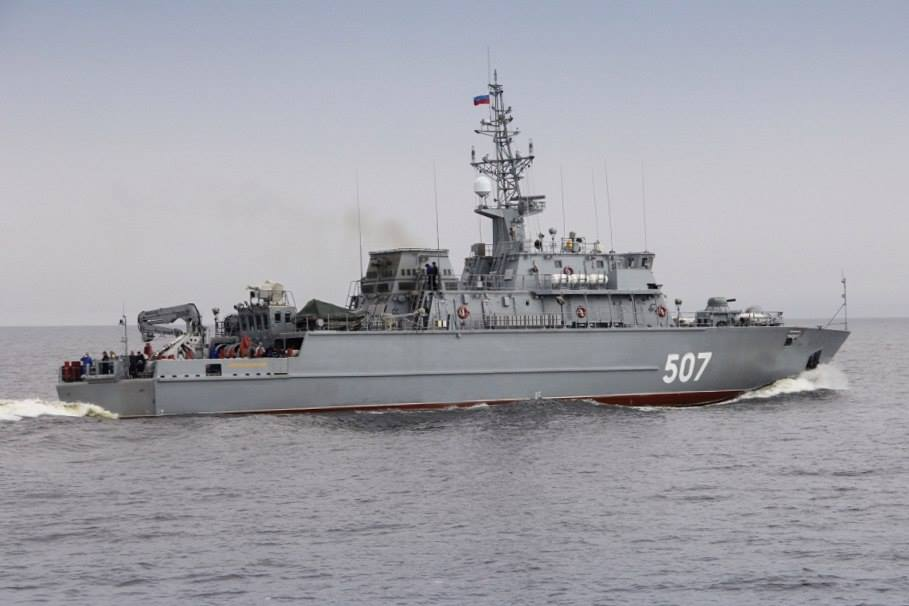
Alexandrit-class minesweeper made by Middle Neva Shipyard

The largest and most high-tech enterprise in the settlement of Pontonnyy is the Middle Neva Shipyard. It is also the largest employer of the settlement . The ships built at this plant serve both in the Russian and in the navies of other countries. There is also a large plywood mill located there . The food industry is represented only by a small enterprise < < Pane>>, which produces bread, cakes and pastries .

=== Other ===
Of the several hundred Russian banks in Pontonnyy only Sberbank has its own branch . The retail chains include Dixie, Magnit, Verny, Fix Price, Ozon, Velikiye Luki Meat Processing Plant and others.

== Transportation ==
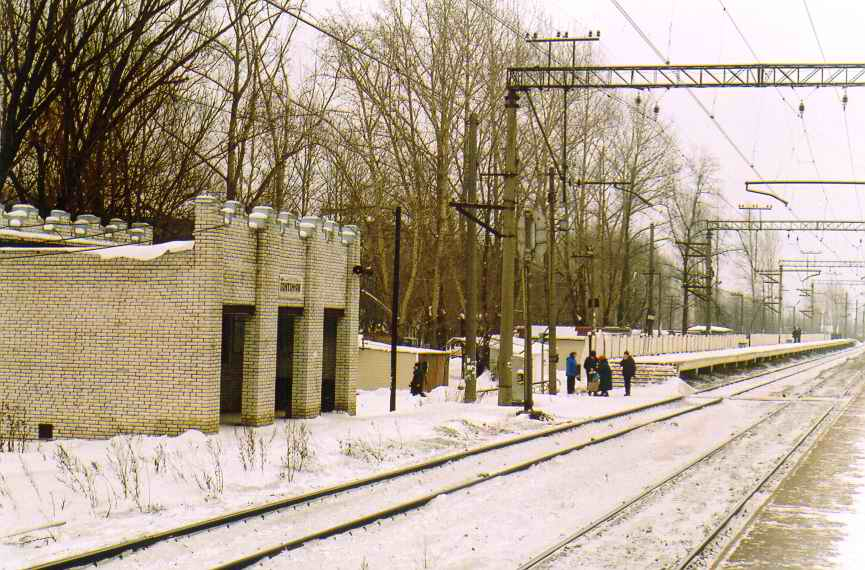
Pontonnaya railway platform

Transport links are provided by commuter trains from Pontonnaya platform to the stations of St. Petersburg, Mga, Volkhovstroy 1, Tikhvin, Kirishi and Budogosch . Bus service to the metro station Proletarskaya and Rybatskoe, as well as to Kolpino, Kirovsk On the Neva, Shlisselburg and Nicolskoye .
