= Morskoy Municipal Okrug =

Coordinates: 59°56′35″N 30°12′20″E

Morskoy Municipal Okrug муниципальный округ Морской
- Municipal okrug
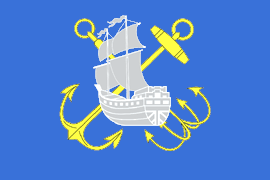
- Flag

- Morskoy Municipal Okrug on the 2006 map of St. Petersburg
- Country: Russia
- Federal city: St. Petersburg

Population (2010 Census)
  - Total: 34,885
- Website: http://округморской-адм.рф/

Morskoy Municipal Okrug (Russian: муниципа́льный о́круг Морской) is a municipal okrug in Vasileostrovsky District, one of the eighty-one low-level municipal divisions of the federal city of St. Petersburg, Russia. As of the 2010 Census, its population was 34,885, up from 31,555 recorded during the 2002 Census.
