= Ostrov Dekabristov Municipal Okrug =

Ostrov Dekabristov Municipal Okrug муниципальный округ Остров Декабристов
- Municipal okrug
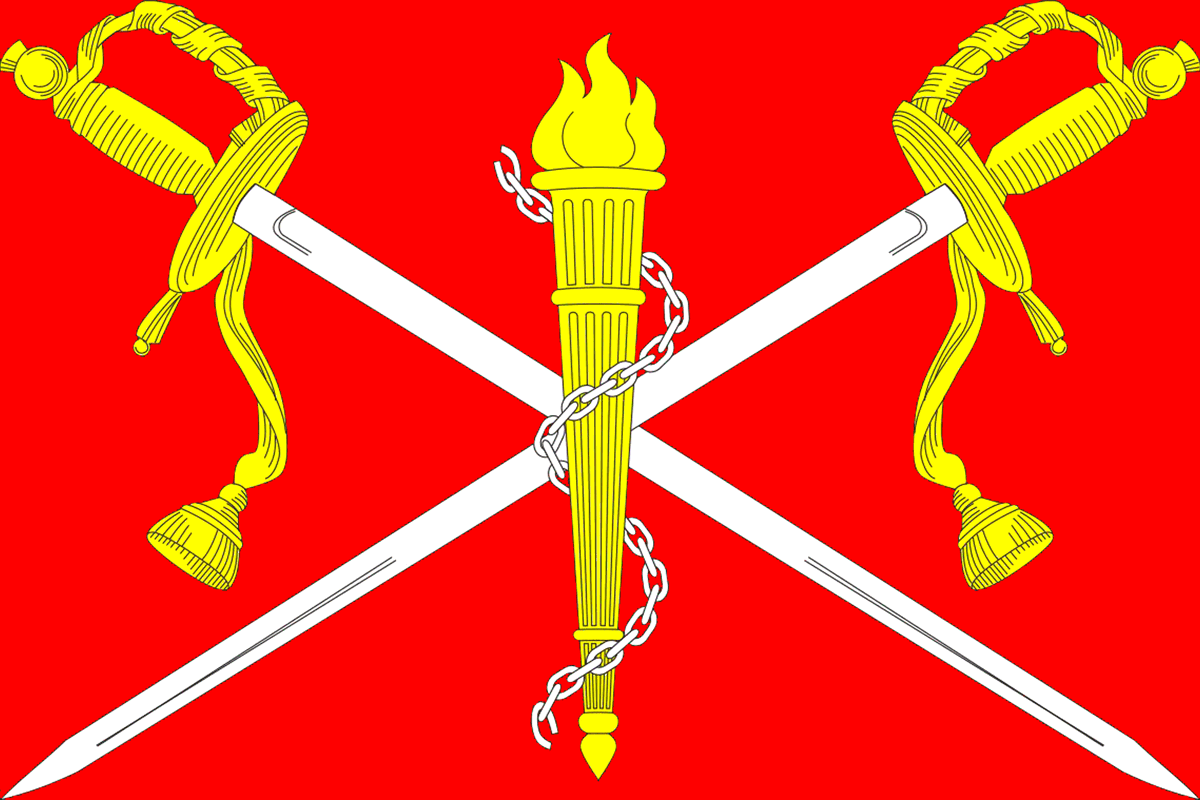
- Flag

- Ostrov Dekabristov Municipal Okrug on the 2006 map of St. Petersburg
- Coordinates: 59°57′10″N 30°14′06″E
- Country: Russia
- Federal city: St. Petersburg

Population (2010 Census)
  - Total: 60,842
- Website: http://округморской-адм.рф/

Ostrov Dekabristov Municipal Okrug (Russian: муниципа́льный о́круг Остров Декабристов) is a municipal okrug in Vasileostrovsky District, one of the eighty-one low-level municipal divisions of the federal city of St. Petersburg, Russia. As of the 2010 Census, its population was 60,842, up from 53,882 recorded during the 2002 Census.
