= Ushkovo, Saint Petersburg =

Municipal settlement in St. Petersburg, Russia

Coordinates: 60.2°N 29.64°E

Location of Ushkovo on the 2006 map of St. Petersburg

Ushkovo (Russian: Ушково; Finnish: Tyrisevä) is a municipal settlement in Kurortny District of the federal city of St. Petersburg, Russia, located on the Karelian Isthmus, on the northern shore of the Gulf of Finland. Population: 618 (2010 census); 482 (2002 census); 6,031 (1989 Soviet census).

Before the Winter and the Continuation Wars, it was a part of Finland's municipality of Terijoki (modern Zelenogorsk).
