= Municipal Okrug 7 =

Municipal Okrug of Saint Petersburg

Coordinates: 59.9333°N 30.2667°E

Municipal Okrug #7 on the 2006 map of St. Petersburg

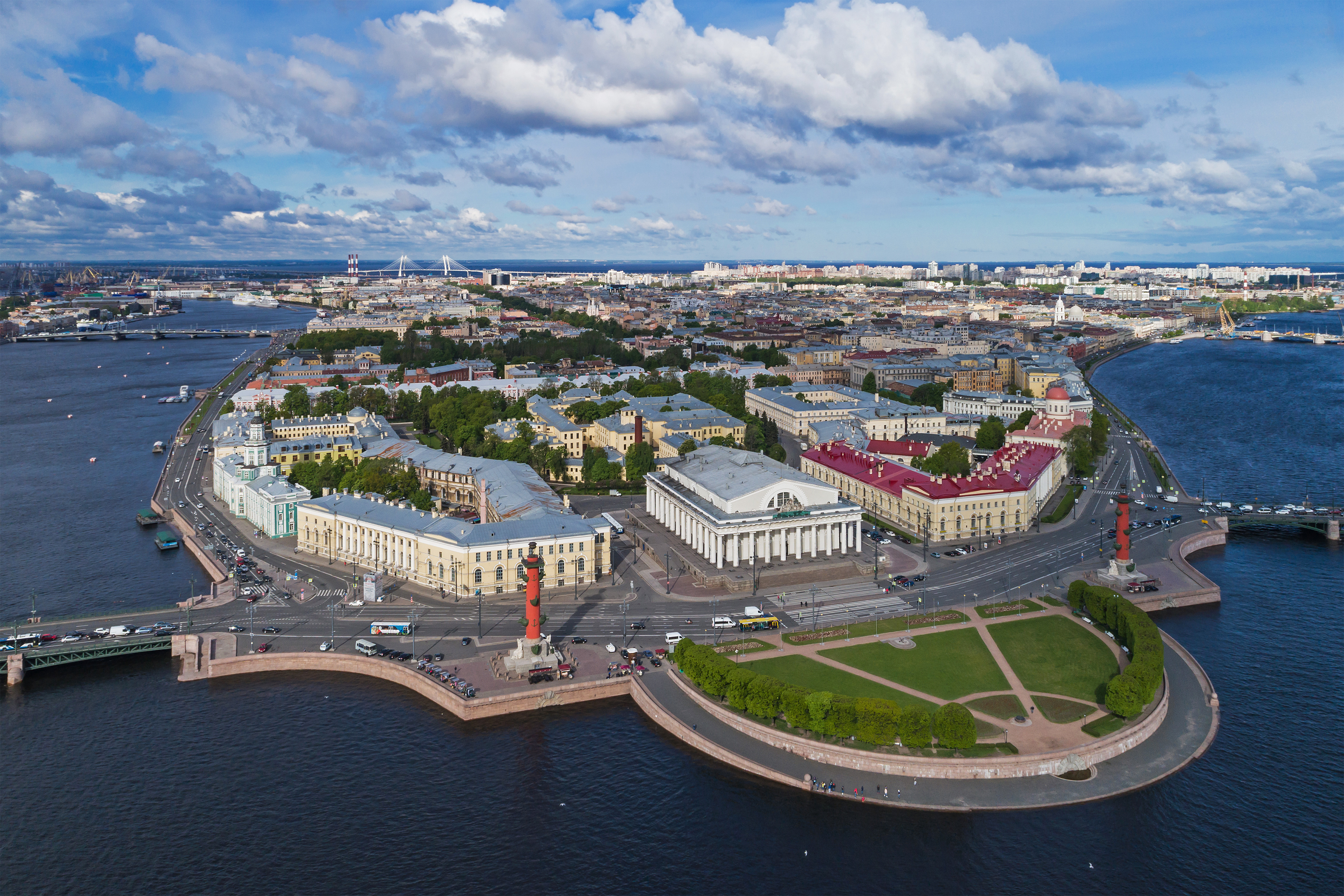
The spit of Vasilyevsky Island

Municipal Okrug #7 (Russian: муниципа́льный о́круг № 7) is a municipal okrug of Vasileostrovsky District of the federal city of St. Petersburg, Russia. Population: 39,168 (2010 census); 45,696 (2002 census).

It borders Sredny Avenue, 25 Line, Bolshoy Avenue, Detskaya Street, and Kosaya Line in the north and in the west, the Neva River in the south and in east.

The eastern side of the okrug is old. The majority of the tourist sights, such as the Old Saint Petersburg Stock Exchange and Rostral Columns, Kunstkamera, Saint Petersburg State University, Imperial Academy of Arts, and the Menshikov Palace are located there.

The central part is mostly financial and is home to the Saint Petersburg Stock Exchange. The western side is mostly industrial and houses the port of Saint Petersburg.
