= Petro-Slavyanka =

Municipal settlement in Saint Petersburg, Russia

Coordinates: 59°48′N 30°30′E

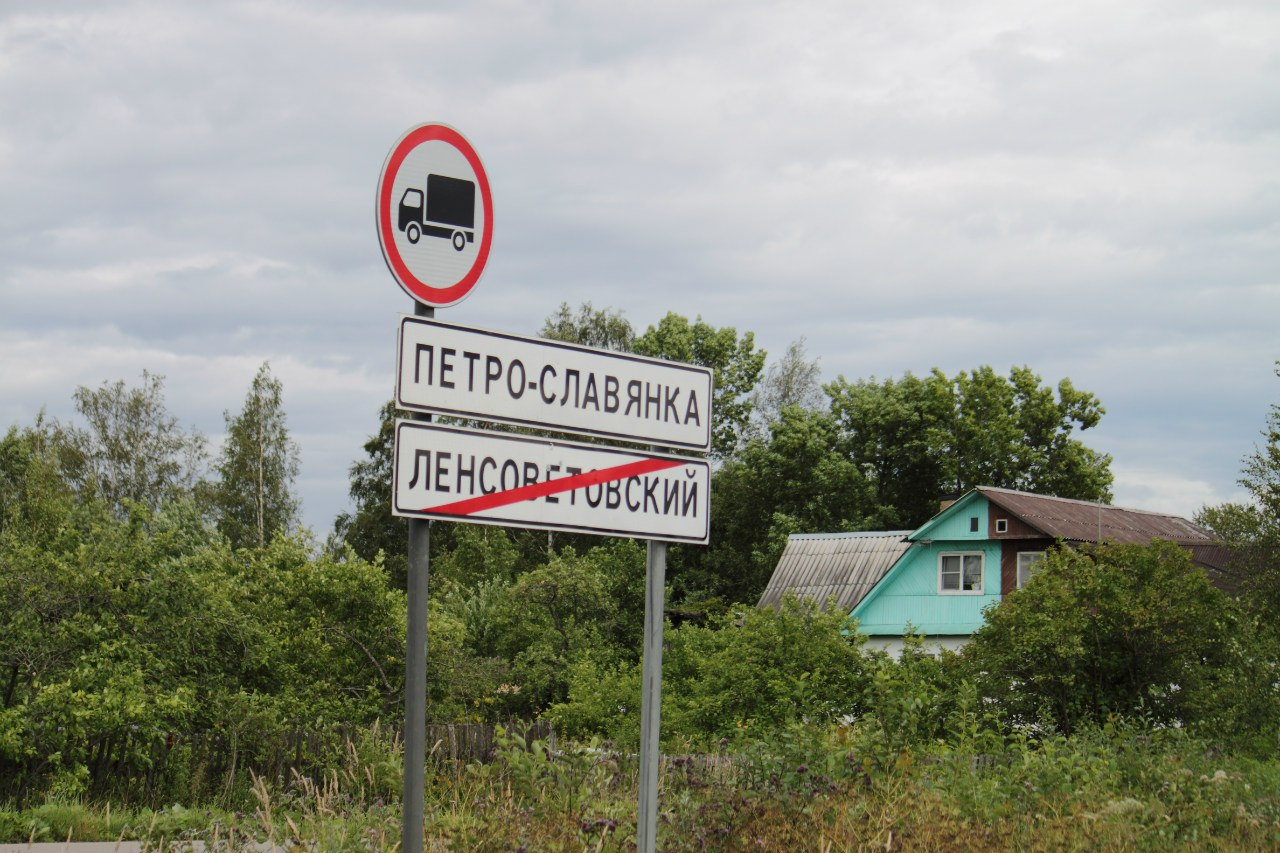
Petro-Slavyanka

Petro-Slavyanka (Russian: Пе́тро-Славя́нка) is a municipal settlement in Kolpinsky District of the federal city of St. Petersburg, Russia. Population: 1,085 (2010 census); 1,337 (2002 census); 1,312 (1989 Soviet census).

It consists mostly of single-family houses. It is a place to have a dacha and many people live permanently as well.

It is on the same rail line that goes from St. Petersburg to Kolpino. The rail stop name is Slavyanka. The Slavyanka River also runs through it.
