= Anton de Vieira =

António Manuel de Vieira, known in Russia as Count Anton Manuilovich Devier (also spelled Divier; Russian: Антон Мануилович Девиер – c. 1682 – 6 July [O.S. 24 June] 1745), was one of Peter I's foreign associates, who proved to be an efficient administrator in St Petersburg and Siberia. He was St. Petersburg's first chief of police and was identified as a main rival of Alexander Danilovich Menshikov at Catherine I's court. De Vieira was the father of Peter Devier.

== Biography ==
His date and place of birth are uncertain - sources differ on whether he was born in Portugal, in the province of Minho, in 1673–1674, or less likely in Amsterdam c. 1682. An account cited that he was an alleged descendant of the Portuguese Marranos. His mother was a Christian but his father was a Jew who moved with his family from Portugal to the Low Countries where he converted to Christianity. During the Grand Embassy of Peter the Great to Europe (1697), the tsar was allowed by the Dutch sailors to command a ship, where Vieira served as a cabin-boy. He was taken by the tsar to Russia in the capacity of his page and orderly, gradually rising to the rank of adjutant-general in 1718.

That same year, he fell in love with Prince Menshikov's sister and seduced her. They were apprehended by her brother, who ordered Vieira to be beaten to death. The latter, however, appealed to the tsar for mercy, and Peter ordered Vieira to be liberated and married to Menshikov's sister the very next day. A month later, he was appointed the first chief of St Petersburg Police. During his term in office, Vieira gained renown for his strict attitude towards brigands and outlaws who had previously crowded to the newly built Russian capital.

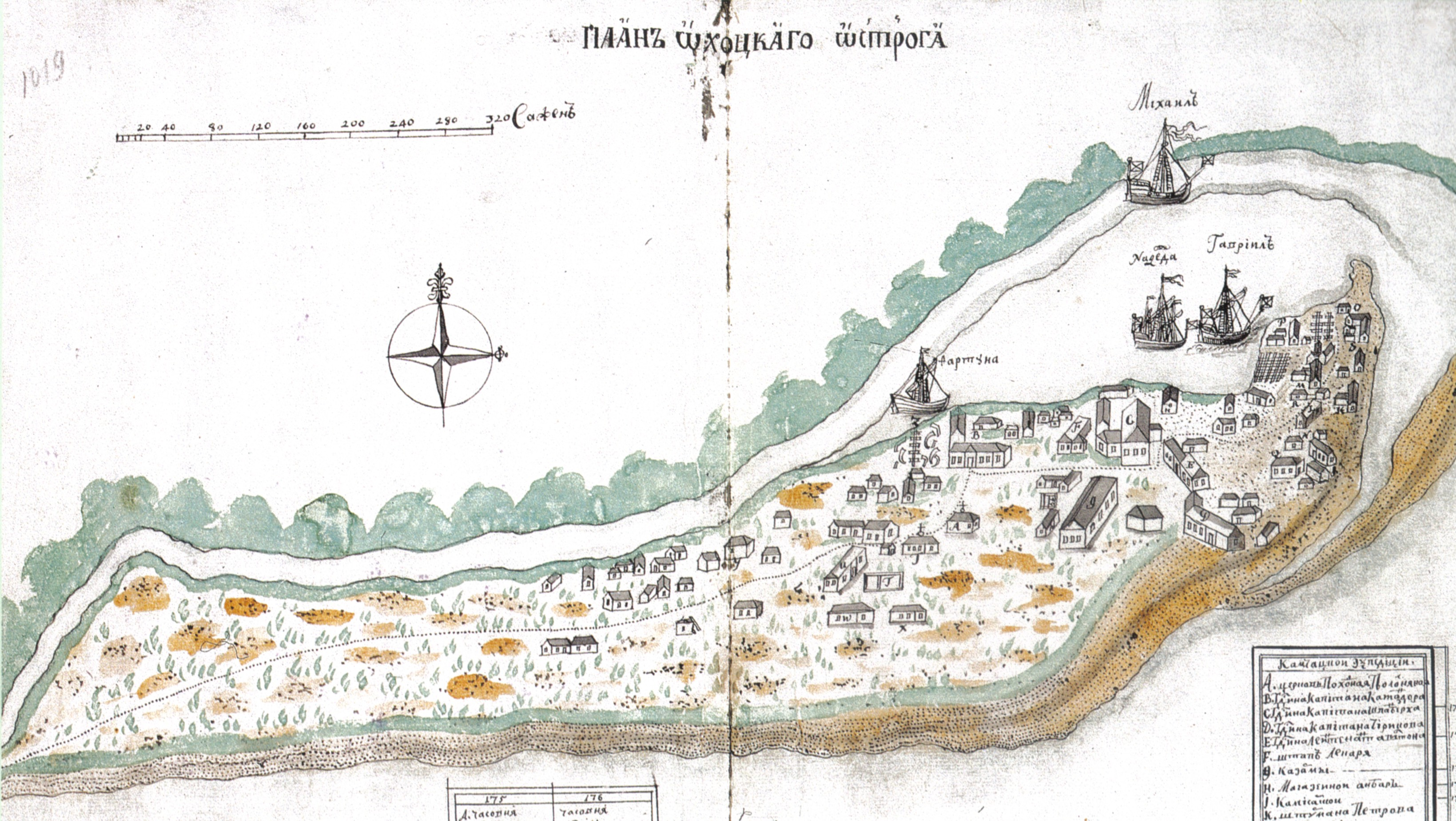
Map of Okhotsk, ink drawing, 1737.

After Peter's death, Vieira managed to maintain his position, chiefly through the influence of his wife, a lady-in-waiting at the court of Catherine I. On 24 October 1726 he was made count and admitted to the Senate. His brother-in-law's influence on the Empress, however, was paramount. As Vieira dared to oppose Menshikov's plan of marrying his daughter to the future Peter II of Russia, he was arrested and put to the torture. After 10 days of inquest, Vieira was stripped of his estates and titles and exiled to Yakutia, where he would live in utter oblivion for four years.

In 1731, when Vitus Bering was commissioned to set a separate government for Okhotsk, he could not find anywhere in the Far East a more capable and experienced man than Vieira. The latter was summoned to Okhotsk and appointed its governor in 1739. During his term in office, he established a shipyard and a nautical school, which would continue for a century.

Upon Elizaveta Petrovna's ascension to the throne in 1741, she was told that the associate of her father was still living on the shores of the Pacific. The old man was recalled to St Petersburg and reinstated as its police chief. Having been restituted in his comital title and invested with the Order of St. Alexander Nevsky, Vieira died in 1745.
