= Serovo =

Municipal settlement in St. Petersburg, Russia

Coordinates: 60°12′0″N 29°33′36″E

Location of Serovo on the 2006 map of St. Petersburg

Serovo (Russian: Серо́во; Finnish: Vammelsuu) is a municipal settlement in Kurortny District of the federal city of St. Petersburg, Russia, located on the Karelian Isthmus, on the northern shore of the Gulf of Finland, where the Roshchinka River (Finnish: Vammeljoki) empties into the gulf. Population: 280 (2010 census); 252 (2002 census).
