= Moskovskaya zastava Municipal Okrug =

Moskovskaya zastava Municipal Okrug муниципальный округ Московская застава
- Municipal okrug
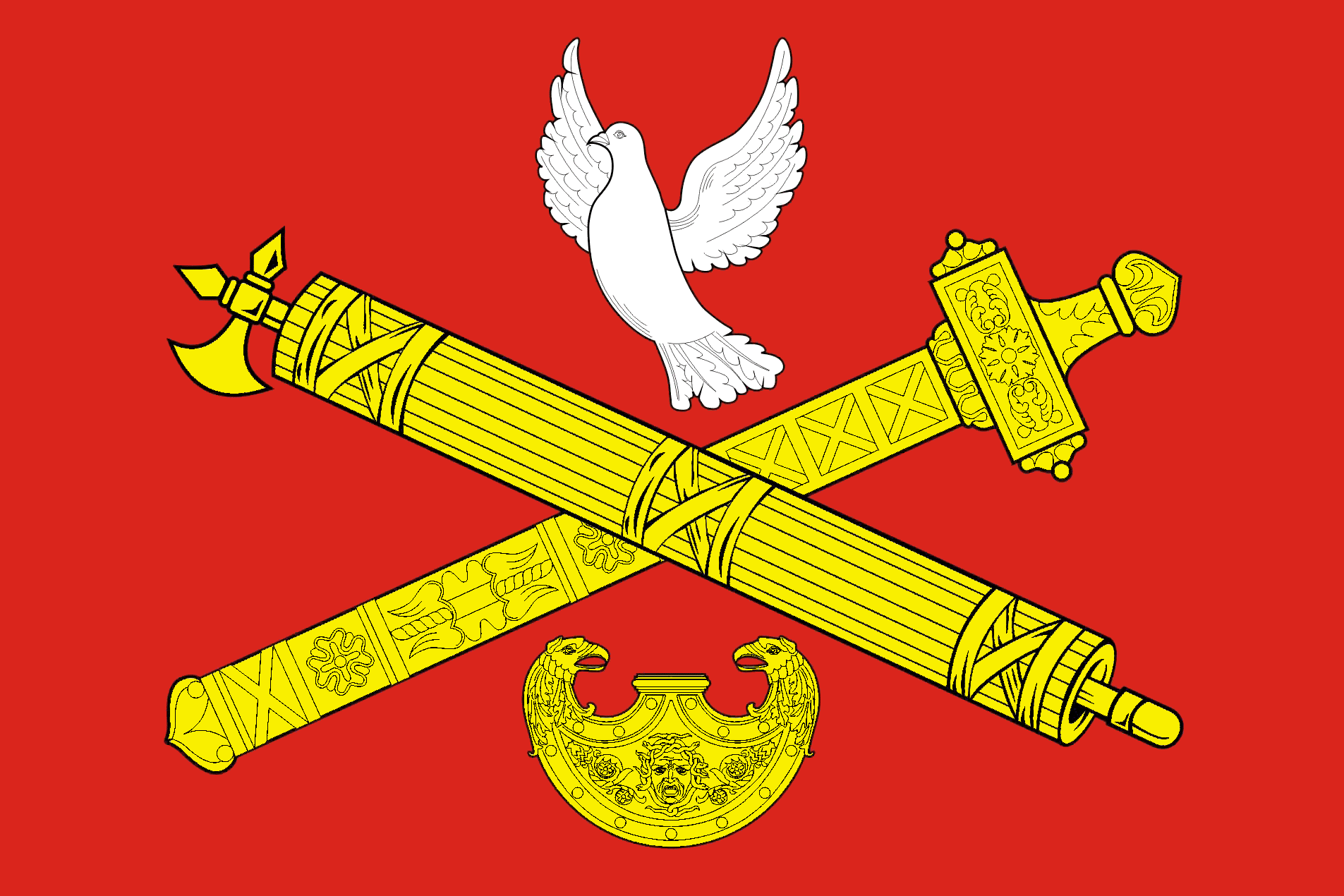
- Flag

- Moskovskaya zastava Municipal Okrug on the 2006 map of St. Petersburg
- Coordinates: 59°53′N 30°19′E
- Country: Russia
- Federal city: St. Petersburg

Area
  - Total: 10.007415 km^{2} (3.863885 sq mi)

Population (2010 Census)
  - Total: 45,680
- Website: http://mo44.net

Moskovskaya zastava Municipal Okrug (Russian: муниципа́льный о́круг Моско́вская заста́ва) is a municipal okrug in Moskovsky District, one of the eighty-one low-level municipal divisions of the federal city of St. Petersburg, Russia. As of the 2010 Census, its population was 45,680, down from 46,951 recorded during the 2002 Census.

It was formerly known as Municipal Okrug #44 (муниципальный округ №44).
