= Tyarlevo =

Municipal settlement in St. Petersburg, Russia

Coordinates: 59°42′9″N 30°26′59″E

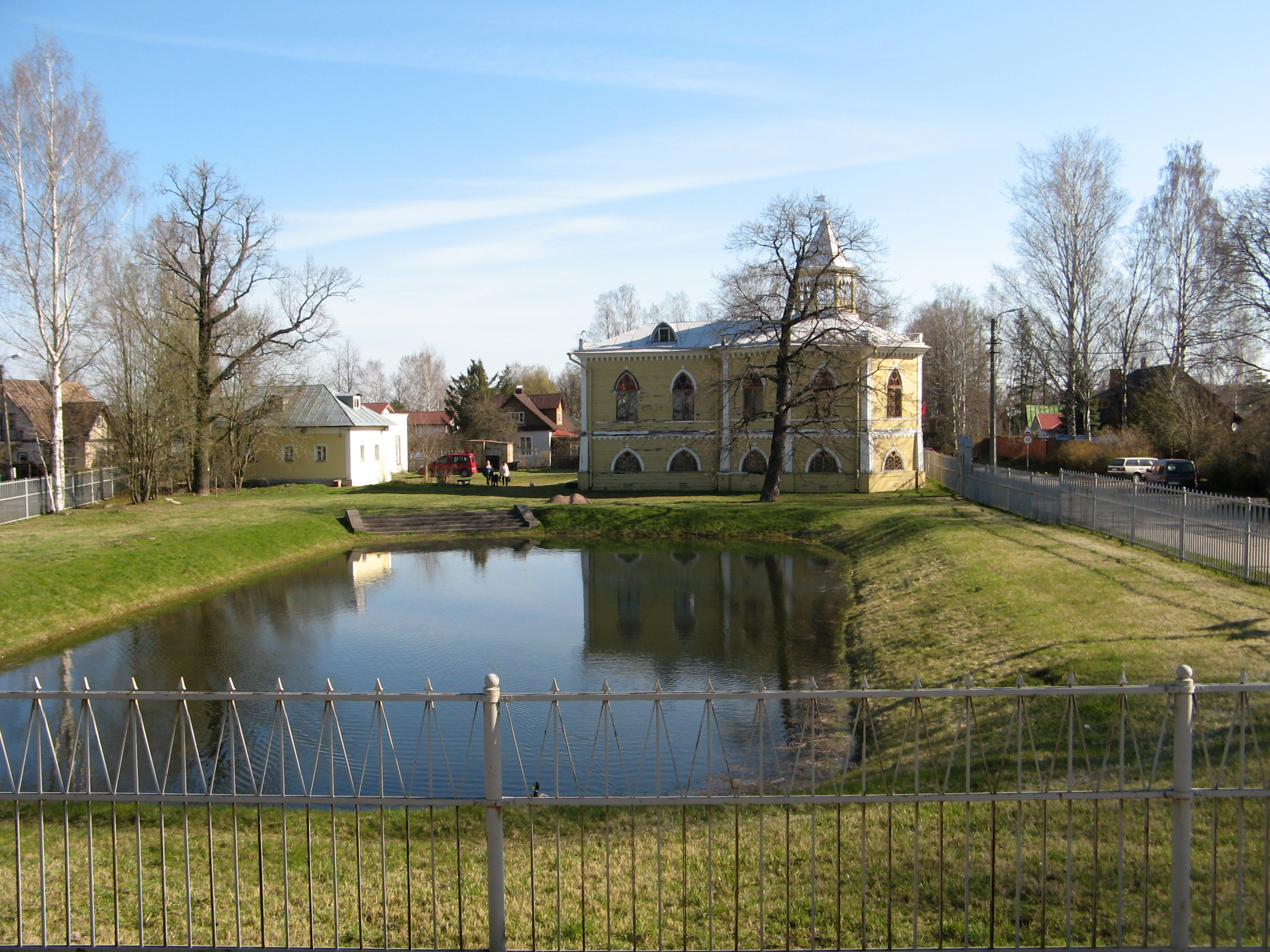
Farm with a pond: Tyarlevo village, Novovestiskaya street, 18, Pavlovsk, Pushkinsky district, St. Petersburg.

Tyarlevo (Russian: Тярлево) is a municipal settlement in Pushkinsky District of the federal city of St. Petersburg, Russia. Population: 1,854 (2010 census); 1,556 (2002 census);
