= Eduard Seleznev =

Russian serial killer and cannibal

- Born: Eduard Valerievich Seleznev; 1969 (age 56–57); Arkhangelsk, Arkhangelsk Oblast, RSFSR
- Other name: "The Arkhangelsk Cannibal"
- Conviction: Murder ×3
- Penalty: 13 years imprisonment (first murders); Life imprisonment (final murders)

Details
- Victims: 5
- Span of crimes: 2002; 2016 – 2018
- Country: Russia
- State: Arkhangelsk
- Date apprehended: 2018

Eduard Valerievich Seleznev (Russian: Эдуард Валерьевич Селезнёв; born 1969), known as The Arkhangelsk Cannibal (Архангельский каннибал), is a Russian serial killer and cannibal who murdered three drinking companions in Arkhangelsk between 2016 and 2018, and whose bodies he later dismembered and consumed. Previously convicted of a double murder in 2002, he was found guilty of the new murders in 2020 and sentenced to life imprisonment in a special regime colony.

== Early life ==
Seleznev was born in Arkhangelsk in 1969. From an early age, he was sent to a boarding school and never got to know his parents. He studied until the 8th grade and was characterized as slow, uninitiated and a habitual smoker who engaged in thefts. In 1984, he graduated from a vocational school as a bricklayer, working odd jobs to make ends meet, and he lived in a run-down hostel. On several occasions, he was convicted of embezzlement, and after one of his releases in 2000, the now-jobless Seleznev alternated between living in unlocked basements and homeless shelters. In 2002, he was convicted of a double murder and served 13 years in prison before being released in September 2015. He was back to living on the streets, where he survived by killings stray cats and dogs, sometimes birds as well, whose corpses he would eat.

== Murders ==
In March 2016, Seleznev killed his first victim, a fellow homeless man he had shared a room with at a shelter. He stabbed the man with a knife, then used an axe to dismember his corpse. He made kholodets (aspic, or jellied meat) from the remains and ate them; he had trouble eating hard foods due to his lack of teeth. After wrapping the remaining body parts in garbage bags, he threw them into the Volokhnitsa River, in the Isagorsk District.

Two years later, in March 2018, Seleznev moved into the apartment of another man, whom he promptly killed and cannibalized in a similar manner to the first. He disposed of the corpse in Lake Butygino in the Mayskaya Gorksa District. He decided to remain in the victim's flat and began work at a local meat processing plant. At some point, the man's relatives, desperate to get in touch with the missing man, travelled to the apartment, only to find that only Eduard was present. When questioned about his roommate's whereabouts, he replied that the man was alive and well, and had moved to St. Petersburg, where he supposedly had been offered a job concerning "something to do with the forest". Seleznev claimed that the man had borrowed a backpack, left 35 thousand rubles for the rent, and departed.

Skeptical of the story, the family members ordered Seleznev to clean the mess he had created in the apartment. While inspecting the fridge, they noticed some odd-looking unpackaged meat lying on one of the rafts. Seleznev noticed this and told them that it was raw fish. Upon further investigation, the father of the missing landlord found a jacket with Seleznev's passport in it, as well as a bank card with the name of a man he didn't recognize. As Seleznev had previously claimed to have no personal identification on him, this alarmed the father, who informed the police.

== Arrest, trial and imprisonment ==
After receiving the information about the suspicious findings, authorities went to the apartment and quickly arrested Seleznev. He was brought back to the police station for questioning, and after several interrogations, he readily confessed that he had killed, dismembered and eaten the remains of three drinking companions he had encountered within the last two years. All of them had been stabbed in their sleep and later chopped into pieces with an axe, with some of the remains cannibalized and the others thrown in bodies of water around Arkhangelsk. When asked about his motive, Seleznev claimed that after eating so many animals, he began to develop a craving for human flesh, and additionally claimed that a voice (or voices) had ordered him to kill and consume humans. Due to the severity of his crimes, he was sent for a psychiatric examination, where he was determined to be sane and aware of his actions, in spite of his claims of hearing voices.

Seleznev's trial began on January 13, 2020. From the very beginning, he recanted his confession and demanded a jury trial. Much to his surprise, he was found guilty and sentenced to life imprisonment in a special regime colony, as well as having to pay one million rubles in restitution to the victims' family members.

== See also ==
- Ilshat Kuzikov
- List of incidents of cannibalism
- List of Russian serial killers
