= Volkovskoye Municipal Okrug =

Volkovskoye Municipal Okrug Волковское округ
- Municipal okrug
- Coordinates: 59°54′N 30°22′E
- Country: Russia
- Federal city: St. Petersburg

Population (2010 Census)
  - Total: 59,277
- Website: www.volkovskoe.ru

Volkovskoye Okrug (Russian: Волковское округ) is a municipal okrug in Frunzensky District, one of the eighty-one low-level municipal divisions of the federal city of St. Petersburg, Russia. As of the 2010 Census, its population was 59,277.

== About ==
The okrug has its own symbols - coat of arms, sign and flag. Wolf, an element of the coat of arms, is a symbol of the Volkovka River.

Historical monuments of the district include the Resurrection Church, founded in the 18th century, the Palace of Culture of Zheleznodorozhnikov (former Ligovsky People's House of Countess Panina) - the 19th century, the Literatorskie Mostki memorial - the 19th century.

The Frunzensky district of the city was formed in 1936, and finally formed in 1956.

== Facilities ==
- Housing stock: 177 buildings (with a total area of over 2 million square meters)
- Secondary schools: 13
- Preschool institutions: 14
- Polyclinics: 3
- Libraries: 2
- Large shopping centers: 19
- Consumer service enterprises: 13
