= City hospital No. 40 =

Coordinates: 60.104°N 29.968°E

The Saint Petersburg State Health Care Establishment the City Hospital No 40 of the Resort District
- Saint Petersburg City Government Health Care Committee
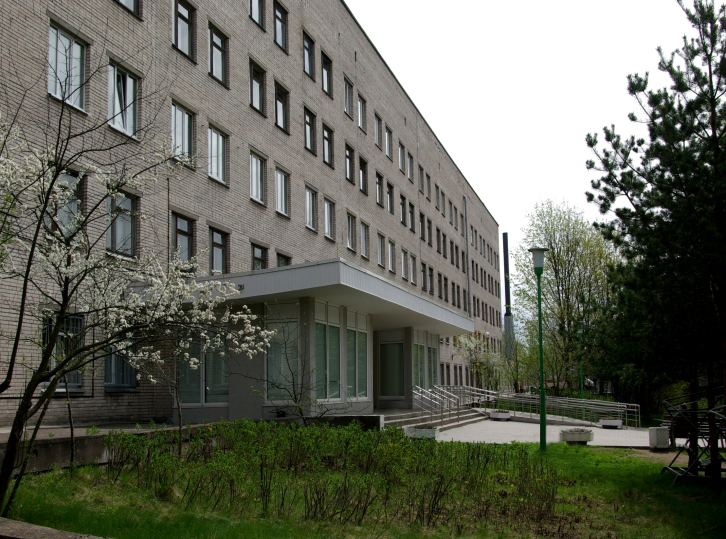
- Rehabilitation Center of the City Hospital No 40 of Saint Petersburg, Russia

Geography
- Location: Sestroretsk, Kurortniy District, Saint Petersburg, Russia

Organisation
- Type: District

Services
- Beds: 1000+

Helipads
- Helipad: No

History
- Founded: 1748

Links
- Website: www.gb40.ru
- Lists: Hospitals in Russia

The City Hospital No 40 of Saint Petersburg, Russia, belongs to the largest health care facilities (more than 1000 beds) for delivering in-patient definitive and specialized medical care in North West Russia. The official name is The Saint Petersburg State Health Care Establishment the City Hospital No 40 of the Resort District. The Hospital is situated within the boundaries of the city of Sestroretsk.

== History ==
The hospital traces its history back to 1748, when a 50-bed infirmary was founded at Sestroretsk armory. Its more detailed history is clearer from the beginning of the 20th century. After the Russian Civil War (1917–1923) the hospital was headed by Sergey Yul’evich Malevskiy (1869—1934). He was a talented Russian surgeon who intensively operated, stayed with severe patients after midnight, spent his scanty means on purchasing surgical instruments, medications and food. Almost all residents of Sestroretsk gathered to pay their last tribute to Sergey Yul’evich. The restoration of the hospital after the Second World War devastation was conducted by the Chief physician Nikolay Evgen’evich Slupskiy (1899–1964). He was an outstanding person who served as a prototype for heroes of Yuriy German novels “My dear man”, “The cause you serve”, “Hello, doctor”, and the tale “The story of doctor Nikolay Evgen’evich”. From the middle of the 1960s, the hospital began to expand. New buildings for pediatric, pulmonological, surgical, and Internal medicine services were constructed. The first specialized proctological unit was opened in Leningrad. Hospital capacity was increased up to 680 beds. On 11 May 1974 on the site of the hospital, the first in-patient 520-bed rehabilitation center in the Soviet Union was opened. In 35 years of this center's existence, more than 250,000 patients have received rehabilitation treatment in it. Since November 2005 the hospital has been headed by professor Sergey Grigor’evich Scherbak.

== Today ==
At the present time the hospital has units in service in following specialties: anesthesiology and resuscitation (2), intensive care (3), vascular surgery, neurology (3), orthopedics (2), traumatology, gynecology, coloproctology, rehabilitation (4), physical methods of treatment (2), and some others. Annually 20,000 patients receive in-patient treatment in the hospital. The hospital possesses modern diagnostic and treatment modalities including X-ray and magnetic resonance computed tomography, and a series of high-tech devices such as the assisting robot for rehabilitation of patients after stroke or spinal cord injury, cardiac shock wave therapy for treatment angina resistant to medications, transcranial magnetic stimulation for treatment the patients with stroke and head injury.

The results of treatment and diagnostic activities have been analyzed and summarized. Since 2010 the hospital has published its yearbook included the scientific works of hospital’s physicians for that year. The table of contents and chapter’s abstracts both in Russian and English are freely available at the hospital web site.
