= Vasilyevsky Municipal Okrug =

Vasilyevsky Municipal Okrug муниципальный округ Васильевский
- Municipal okrug
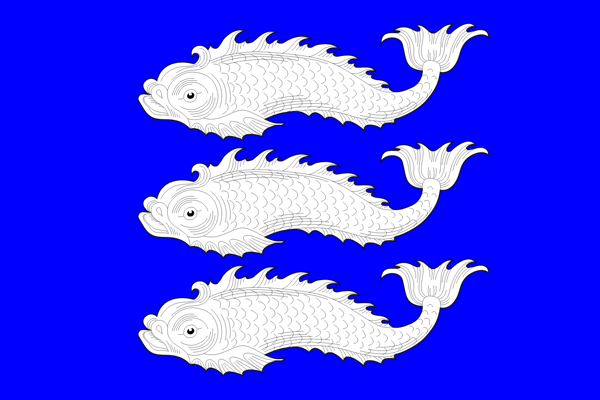
- Flag

- Vasilyevsky Municipal Okrug on the 2006 map of St. Petersburg
- Coordinates: 59.94°N 30.27°E
- Country: Russia
- Federal city: St. Petersburg

Population (2010 Census)
  - Total: 32,236
- Website: http://msmov.spb.ru

Vasilyevsky Municipal Okrug (Russian: муниципа́льный о́круг Васи́льевский) is a municipal okrug in Vasileostrovsky District, one of the eighty-one low-level municipal divisions of the federal city of St. Petersburg, Russia. As of the 2010 Census, its population was 32,236, down from 32,793 recorded during the 2002 Census.

Until May 2008, it was known as Municipal Okrug #8 (муниципальный округ №8).
