= Pesochny, Saint Petersburg =

Municipal settlement in St. Petersburg, Russia

Coordinates: 60.12°N 30.15°E

Pesochny on the 2006 map of St. Petersburg

Pesochny (Russian: Песо́чный) is a municipal settlement in Kurortny District of the federal city of St. Petersburg, Russia, located on the Karelian Isthmus, on the northern shore of the Gulf of Finland. Population: 8,130 (2010 census); 6,487 (2002 census); 7,761 (1989 Soviet census).

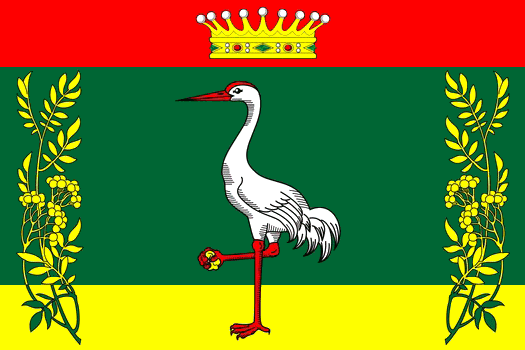
The flag of Pesochny

Until 1925, it was called Grafskaya koloniya (Графская колония, lit. Colony of the earl), or Grafskoye (Графское) for short. Its Finnish name "Raavski" is derived from that name.
