= Pulkovsky meridian Municipal Okrug =

Pulkovsky meridian Municipal Okrug муниципальный округ Пулковский меридиан
- Municipal okrug
- Pulkovsky meridian Municipal Okrug on the 2006 map of St. Petersburg
- Coordinates: 59°51′N 30°18′E
- Country: Russia
- Federal city: St. Petersburg

Population (2010 Census)
  - Total: 43,259
- Website: www.mo47.spb.ru

Pulkovsky meridian Municipal Okrug (Russian: муниципа́льный о́круг Пу́лковский меридиа́н) is a municipal okrug in Moskovsky District, one of the eighteen low-level municipal divisions of the federal city of St. Petersburg, Russia. As of the 2010 Census, its population was 43,259, down from 46,515 recorded during the 2002 Census.

Until August 2008, it was known as Municipal Okrug #47 (муниципальный округ №47).
