= Sapyorny, Saint Petersburg =

Municipal settlement in St. Petersburg, Russia

Coordinates: 59°46′49″N 30°40′39″E

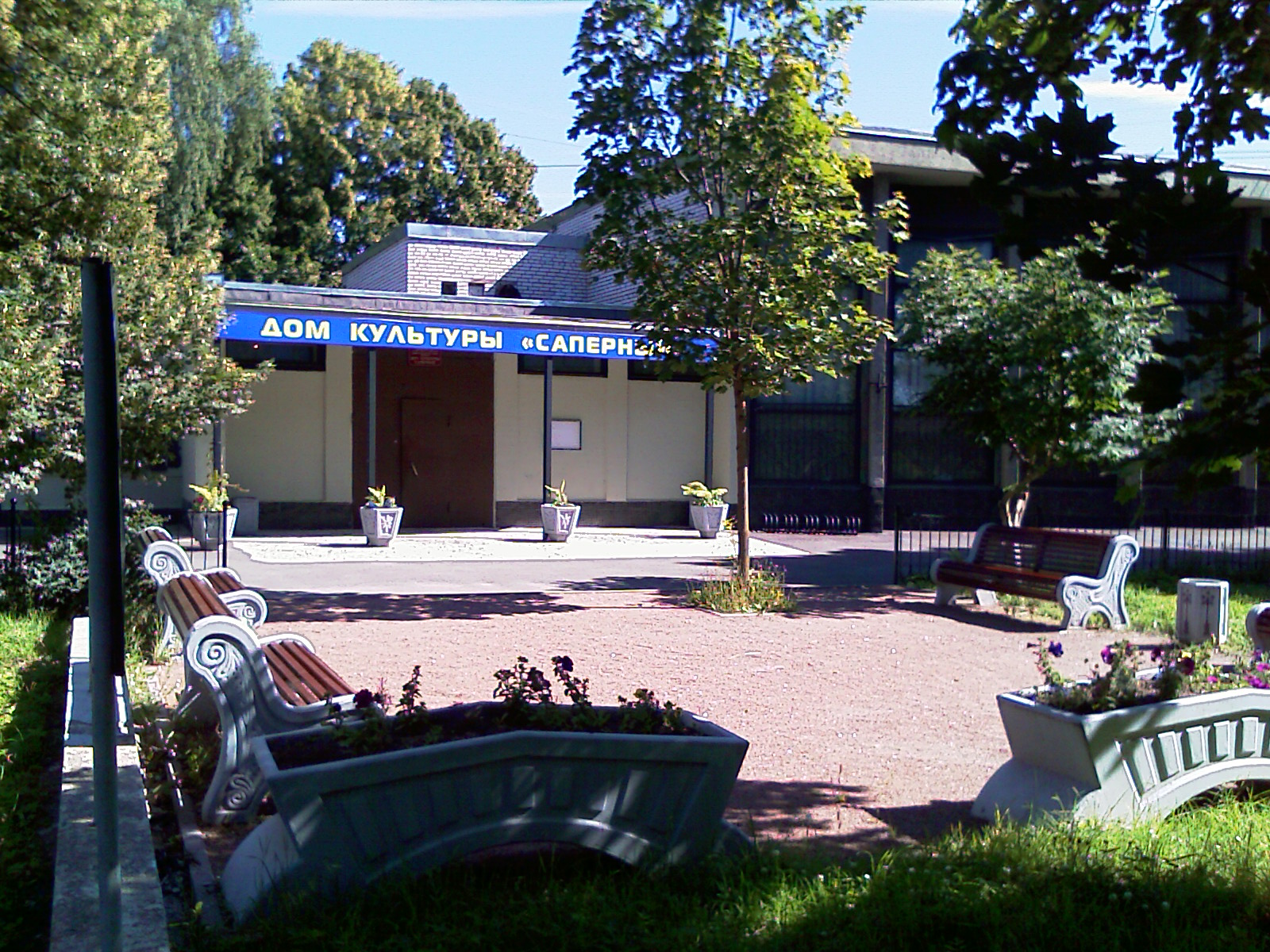
Saperny Culture House entrance

Sapyorny (Russian: Сапёрный) is a municipal settlement in Kolpinsky District of the federal city of St. Petersburg, Russia. Population: 1,378 (2010 census); 1,401 (2002 census);
