= Kronshtadtsky District =

Kronshtadtsky District Кронштадтский район (Russian)
- District
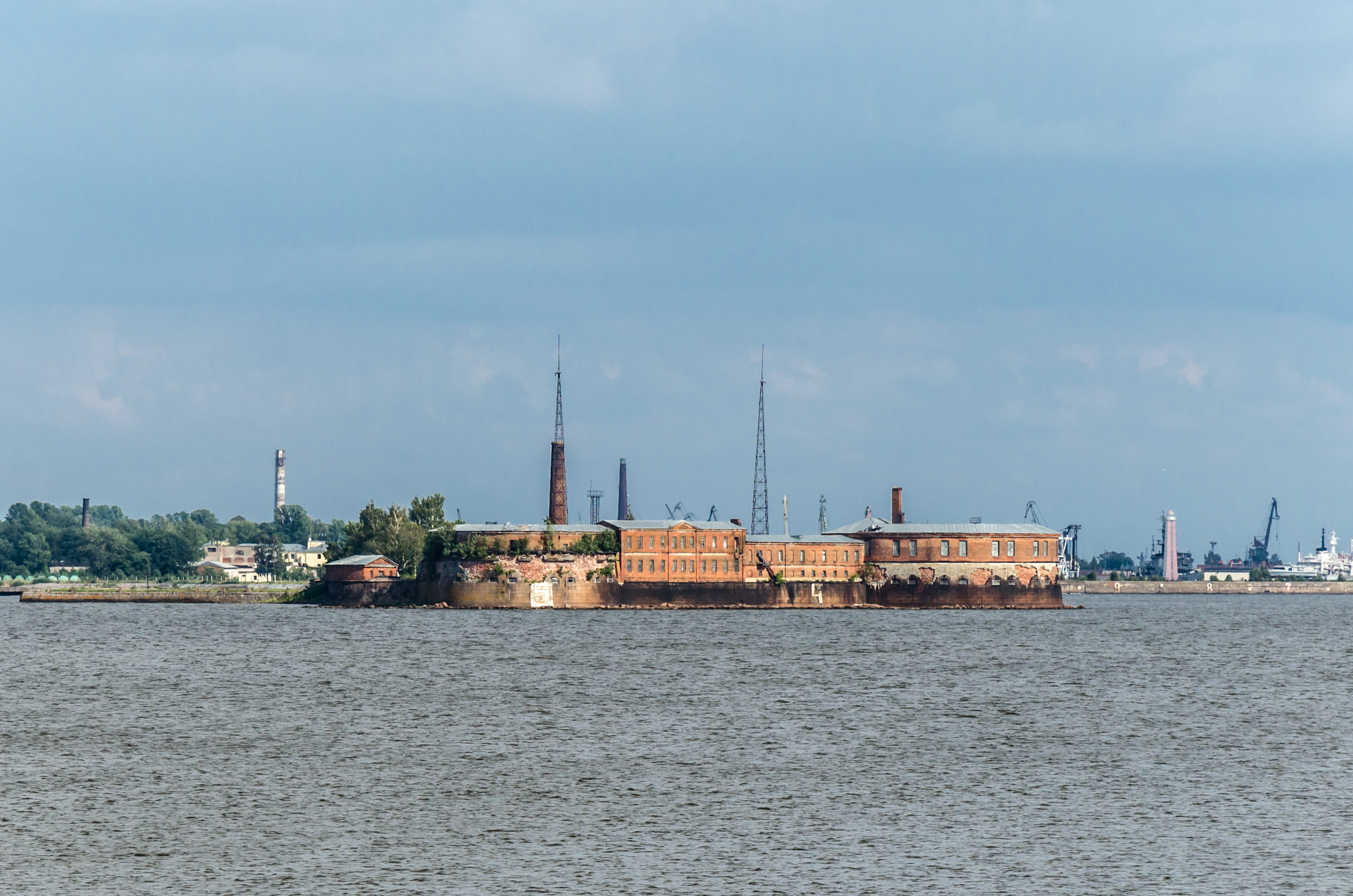
- Fort Peter I in Kronstadt, Kronshtadtsky District

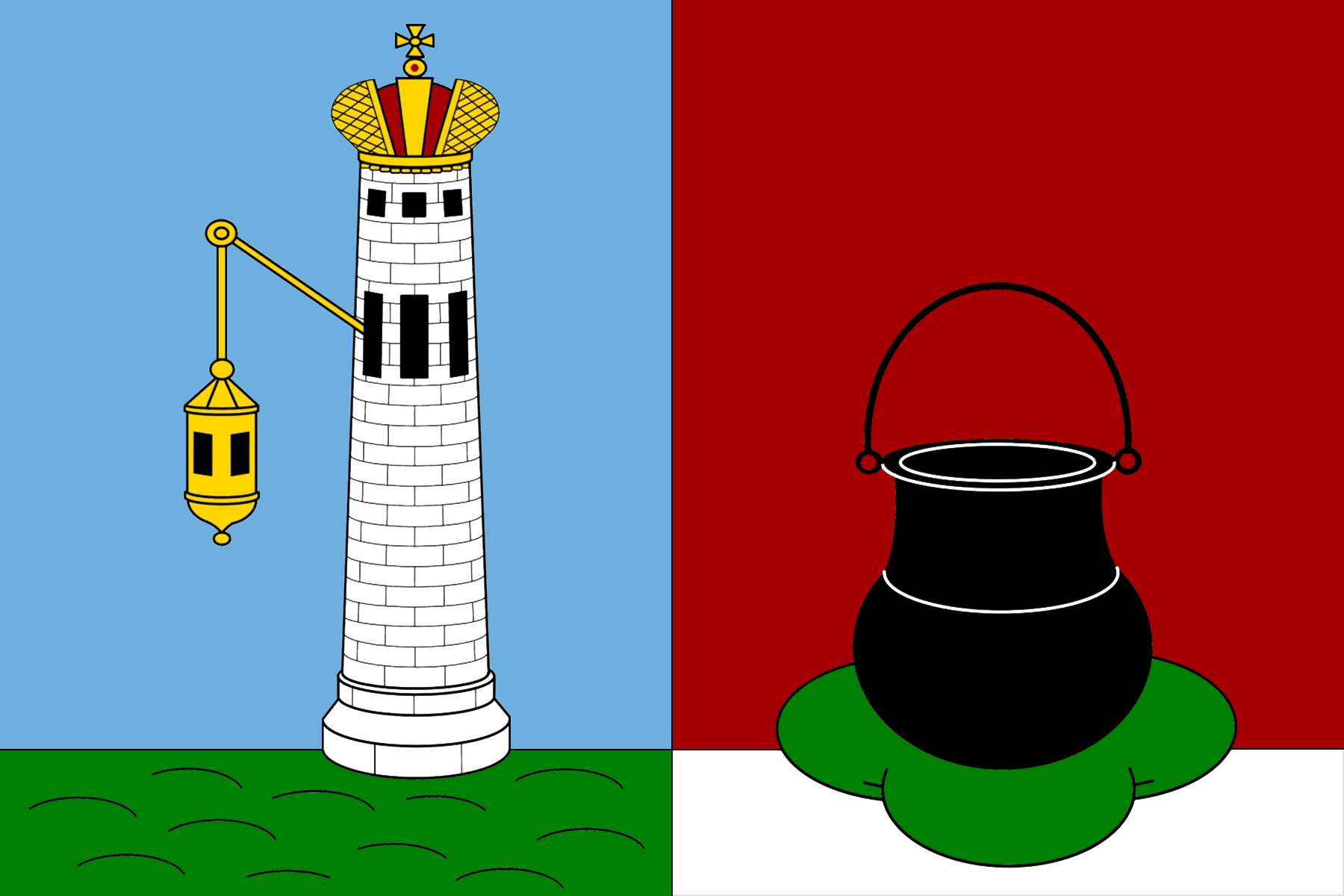
- Flag
- Location of Kronshtadtsky District on the 2006 map of Saint Petersburg
- Coordinates: 60°00′N 29°46′E
- Country: Russia
- Federal subject: federal city of St. Petersburg
- Administrative center: Kronstadt

Population (2010 Census)
  - Total: 43,005
- Website: http://gov.spb.ru/gov/terr/reg_kronsht/

Kronshtadtsky District (Russian: Кроншта́дтский райо́н) is a district of the federal city of St. Petersburg, Russia. As of the 2010 Census, its population was 43,005; down from 43,385 recorded in the 2002 Census.

== Municipal divisions ==
Kronshtadtsky District comprises the municipal town of Kronshtadt.
