= Kurortny District =

Kurortny District Курортный район (Russian)
- District
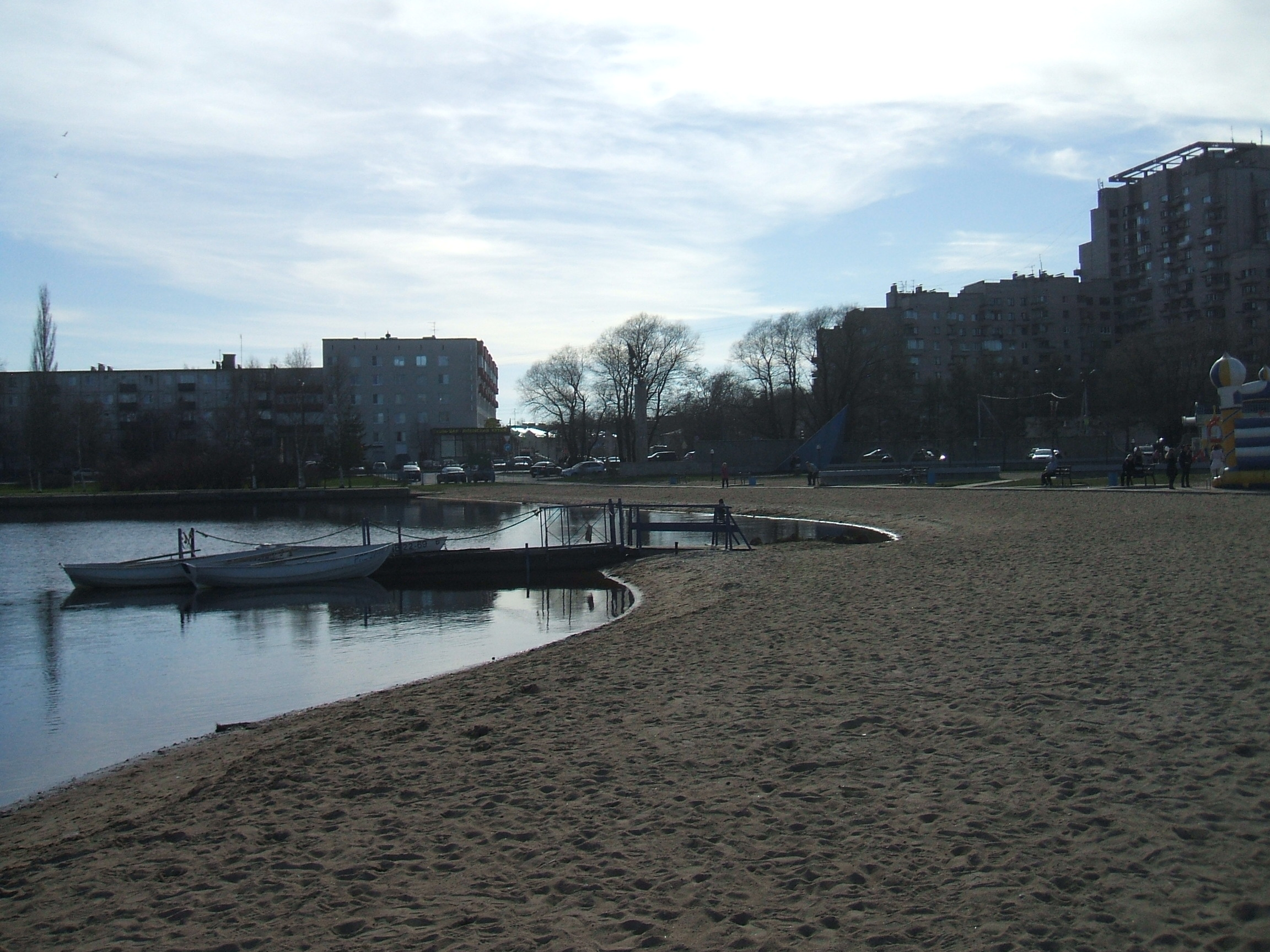
- A beach in Sestroretsk, Kurortny District
- Kurortny District on the 2006 map of St. Petersburg
- Coordinates: 60°10′N 29°55′E
- Country: Russia
- Federal subject: federal city of St. Petersburg
- Established: 21 August 1946

Area
  - Total: 267.9177 km^{2} (103.4436 sq mi)

Population (2010 Census)
  - Total: 70,589
  - Density: 263.47/km^{2} (682.39/sq mi)
- Website: http://gov.spb.ru/gov/terr/reg_kurort/

Kurortny District (Russian: Куро́ртный райо́н) is a district of the federal city of St. Petersburg (since 1994), Russia, located on the Karelian Isthmus along the northern shore of the Gulf of Finland. As of the 2010 Census, its population was 70,589; up from 67,511 recorded in the 2002 Census.

== Municipal divisions ==
Kurortny District comprises two municipal towns (Sestroretsk and Zelenogorsk) and nine municipal settlements (Beloostrov, Komarovo, Molodyozhnoye, Pesochny, Repino, Serovo, Smolyachkovo, Solnechnoye, and Ushkovo).

== Tourism ==
Tourism in the district is driven by Finnish bus tours. The current hotel stock is predominantly economy class, with a few four star hotels. Plans to develop the region's hotel stock are coming to fruition, but the area lacks strong tourist demand.

== Health ==
A large hospital and rehabilitation center is situated in Sestroretsk.
