= Kronverkskoye Municipal Okrug =

Municipal okrug in Petrogradsky District, Russia

Coordinates: 59°57′N 30°19′E

Kronverkskoye Municipal Okrug on the 2006 map of St. Petersburg

Kronverkskoye Municipal Okrug (Russian: муниципа́льный о́круг Кронверкское) is a municipal okrug of Petrogradsky District of the federal city of St. Petersburg, Russia. Population: 20,513 (2010 census); 21,256 (2002 census).

The okrug borders Bolshoy Avenue in the north, Kamenny Island Avenue in the east, the Neva River in the south, and Vvdenskaya Street and Kronverksky Avenue in the west.

Places of interest include the Peter and Paul Fortress, Leningrad Zoo, and the Artillery Museum.
