= Pushkinsky District, Saint Petersburg =

Pushkinsky District Пушкинский район (Russian)
- District
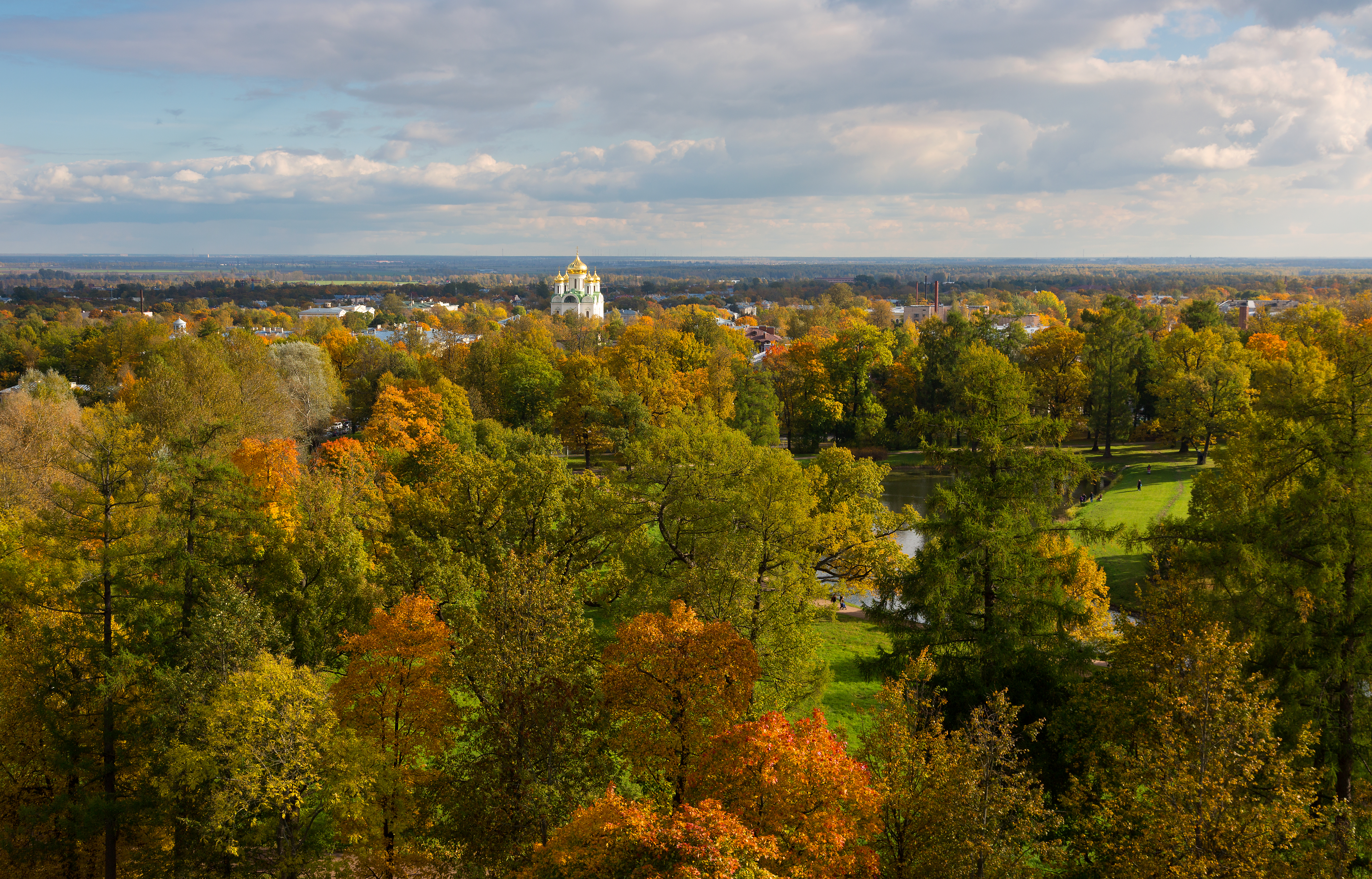
- State Art and Architectural Palace and Park Museum - Reserve Tsarskoye Selo, Pushkinsky District

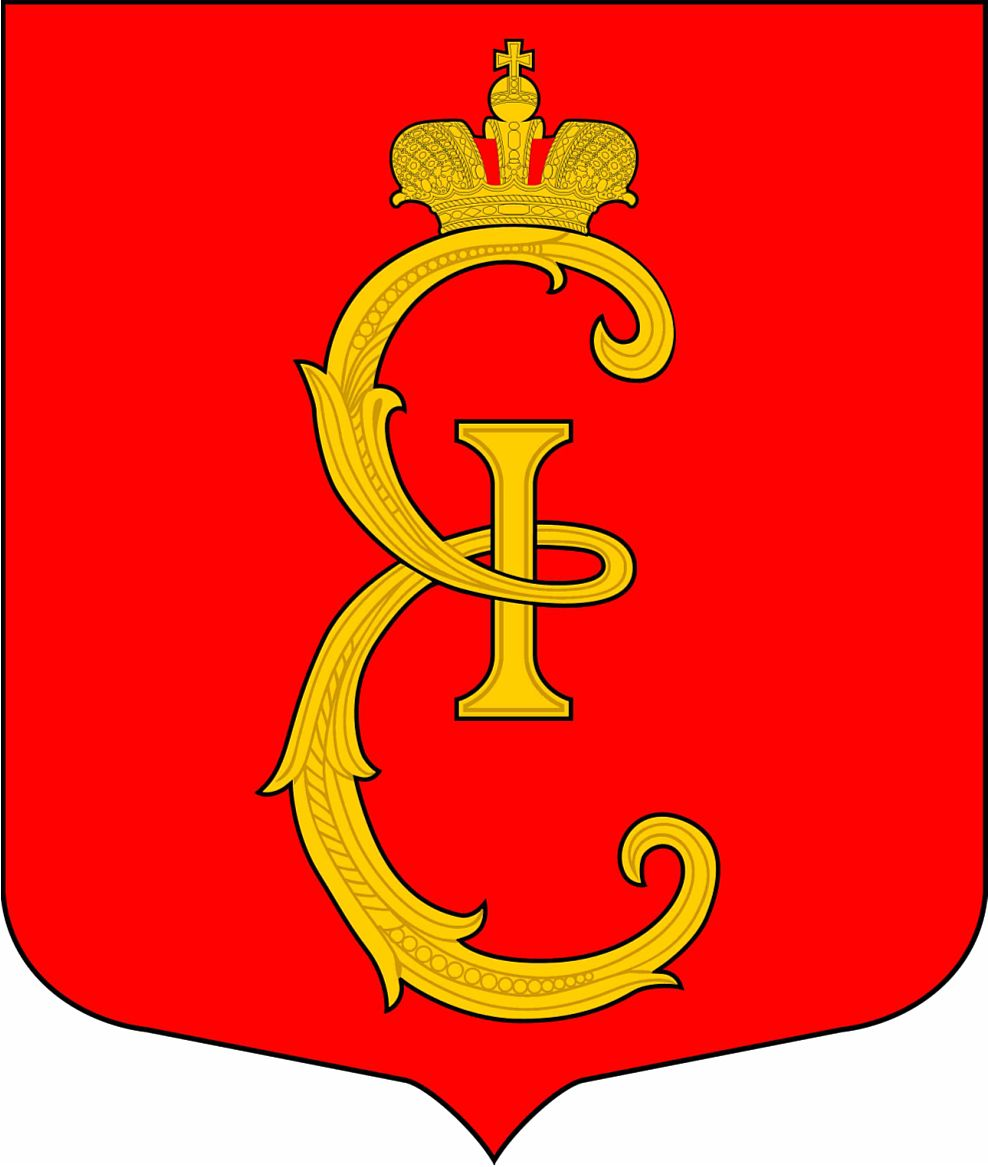
- Coat of arms
- Pushkinsky District in St. Petersburg
- Coordinates: 59°44′N 30°24′E
- Country: Russia
- Federal subject: federal city of St. Petersburg
- Established: 5 June 1938
- Administrative center: Pushkin

Area
  - Total: 240.326 km^{2} (92.790 sq mi)

Population (2010 Census)
  - Total: 135,973
  - Density: 565.786/km^{2} (1,465.38/sq mi)

Pushkinsky District (Russian: Пу́шкинский райо́н) is a district of the federal city of St. Petersburg, Russia. As of the 2010 Census, its population was 135,973; up from 101,655 recorded in the 2002 Census.

== Municipal divisions ==
Pushkinsky District comprises the municipal towns of Pavlovsk and Pushkin and the municipal settlements of Alexandrovskaya, Shushary, and Tyarlevo.
