= Aptekarsky Ostrov Municipal Okrug =

Aptekarsky Ostrov Municipal Okrug муниципальный округ Аптекарский Остров
- Municipal okrug
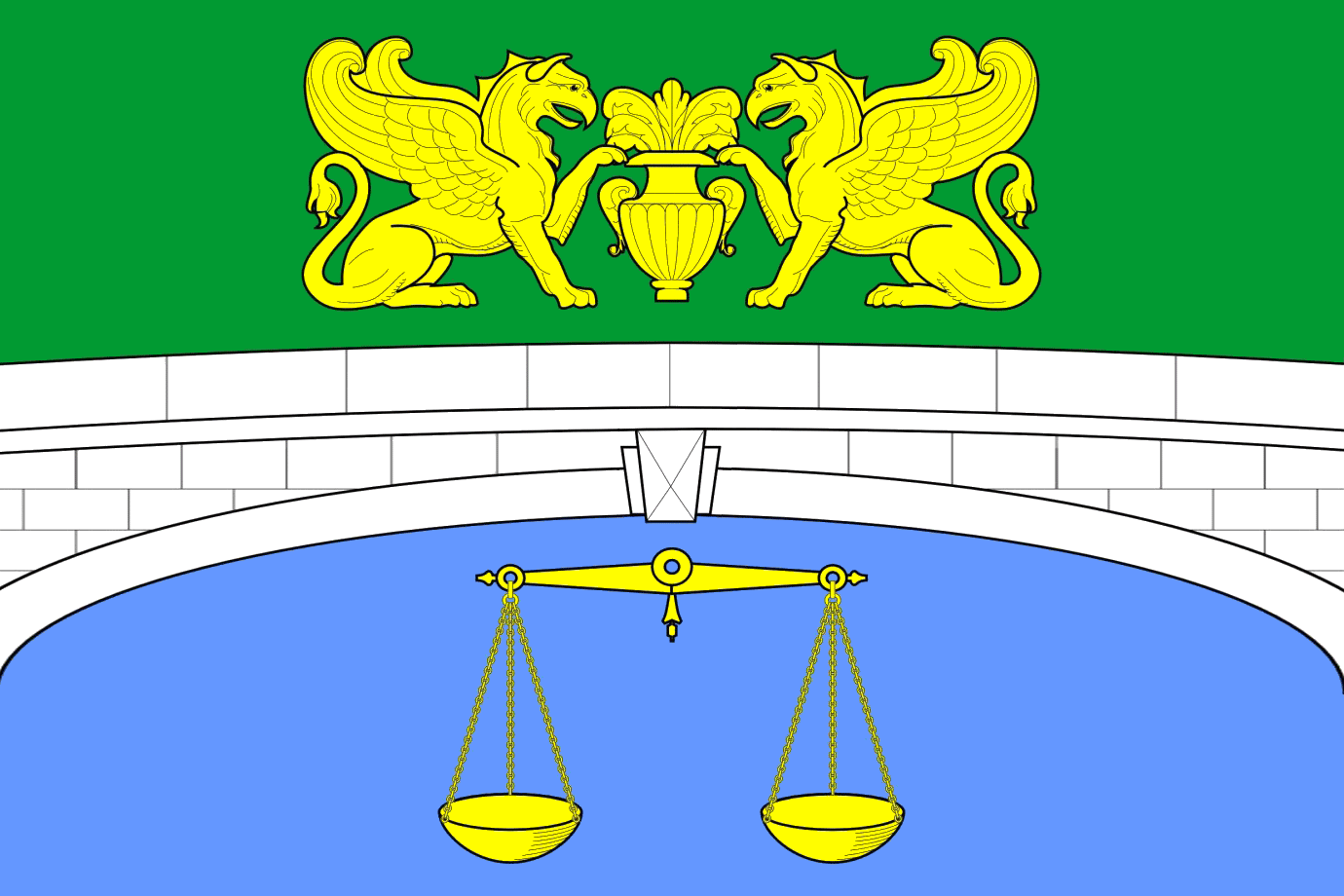
- Flag

- Aptekarsky Ostrov Municipal Okrug on the 2006 map of St. Petersburg
- Coordinates: 59°58′N 30°19′E
- Country: Russia
- Federal city: St. Petersburg

Population (2010 Census)
  - Total: 20,575
- Website: http://www.msapt-ostrov.ru

Aptekarsky Ostrov Municipal Okrug (Russian: муниципа́льный о́круг Апте́карский О́стров) is a municipal okrug in Petrogradsky District, one of the eighty-one low-level municipal divisions of the federal city of St. Petersburg, Russia. As of the 2010 Census, its population was 20,575, up from 19,277 recorded during the 2002 Census.
