= Vasileostrovsky District =

Vasileostrovsky District Василеостровский район (Russian)
- District
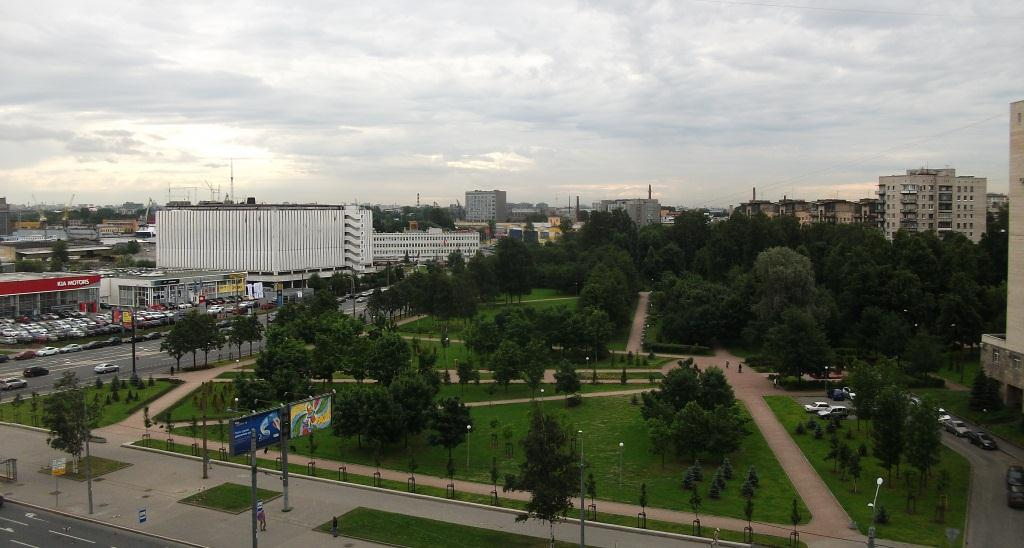
- Decabrist's Garden, Vasileostrovsky District
- Vasileostrovsky District on the 2006 map of St. Petersburg
- Coordinates: 59°56′38″N 30°14′30″E
- Country: Russia
- Federal subject: federal city of St. Petersburg
- Established: 1917

Area
  - Total: 21.4688 km^{2} (8.2892 sq mi)

Population (2010 Census)
  - Total: 203,058
  - Density: 9,458.28/km^{2} (24,496.8/sq mi)
- Website: http://gov.spb.ru/gov/terr/reg_vasileostr/

Vasileostrovsky District (Russian: Василеостро́вский райо́н) is a district of the federal city of St. Petersburg, Russia. As of the 2010 Census, its population was 214,625; down from 236,856 recorded in the 2002 Census.

== Geography ==
The district occupies the territories of Vasilyevsky and Dekabristov Islands and includes a smaller Serny Island.

== History ==
The district was one of the first established in Petrograd in 1917.

== Municipal divisions ==
Vasileostrovsky District comprises the following five municipal okrugs:

- #7
- Ostrov Dekabristov
- Gavan
- Morskoy
- Vasilyevsky

== Transportation ==
Vasilievsky island is connected to the mainland by 6 bridges, 2 bridge of the Western Rapid Diameter and 4 other bridges built before. Also on Vasilevsky island there are 3 underground stations, which are on the green line they are the Primorskaya and Vasileostrovskaya, the purple line station Sportivnaya, and the orange line station Gorny Institut Three more stations were also built on the orange line.
