= Moskovsky District, Saint Petersburg =

Moskovsky District Московский район (Russian)
- District
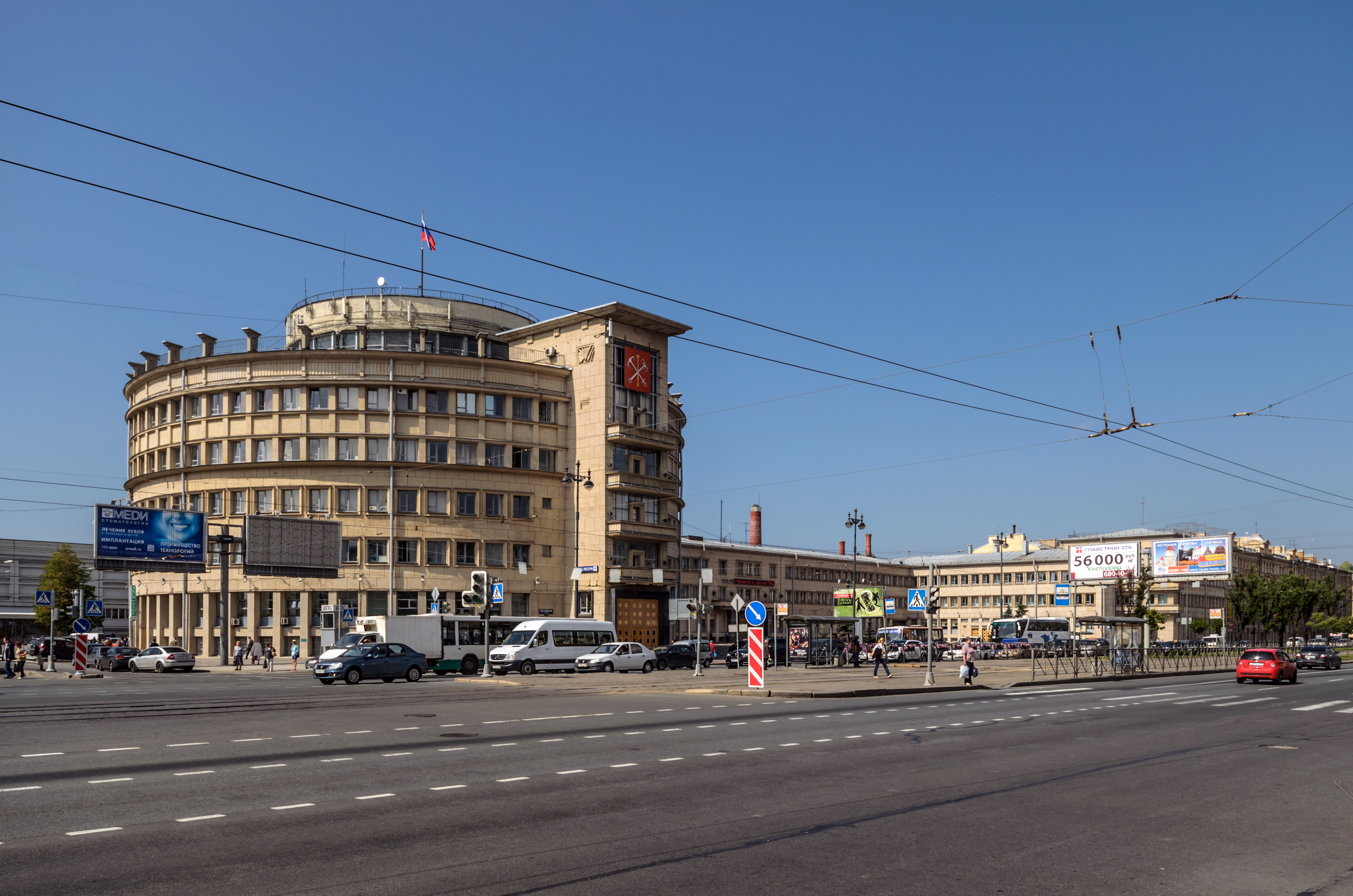
- Moskovsky District Administration building
- Moskovsky District on the 2006 map of St. Petersburg
- Coordinates: 59°49′N 30°18′E
- Country: Russia
- Federal subject: federal city of St. Petersburg
- Established: 1919

Area
  - Total: 71.07 km^{2} (27.44 sq mi)

Population (2010 Census)
  - Total: 288,744
  - Density: 4,063/km^{2} (10,520/sq mi)
- Website: http://gov.spb.ru/gov/terr/reg_moscow/

Moskovsky District (Russian: Моско́вский райо́н) is a district of the federal city of St. Petersburg, Russia. As of the 2010 Census, its population was 288,744; up from 275,884 recorded in the 2002 Census.

== History ==
The district was established in 1919.

The 2nd People's Militia Division was formed rapidly in this district in 1941 in the face of the advancing German armies.

== Municipal divisions ==
Moskovsky District comprises the following five municipal okrugs:

- Gagarinskoye
- Moskovskaya zastava
- Novoizmaylovskoye
- Pulkovsky meridian
- Zvyozdnoye
