= Frunzensky District, Saint Petersburg =

Frunzensky District Фрунзенский район (Russian)
- District
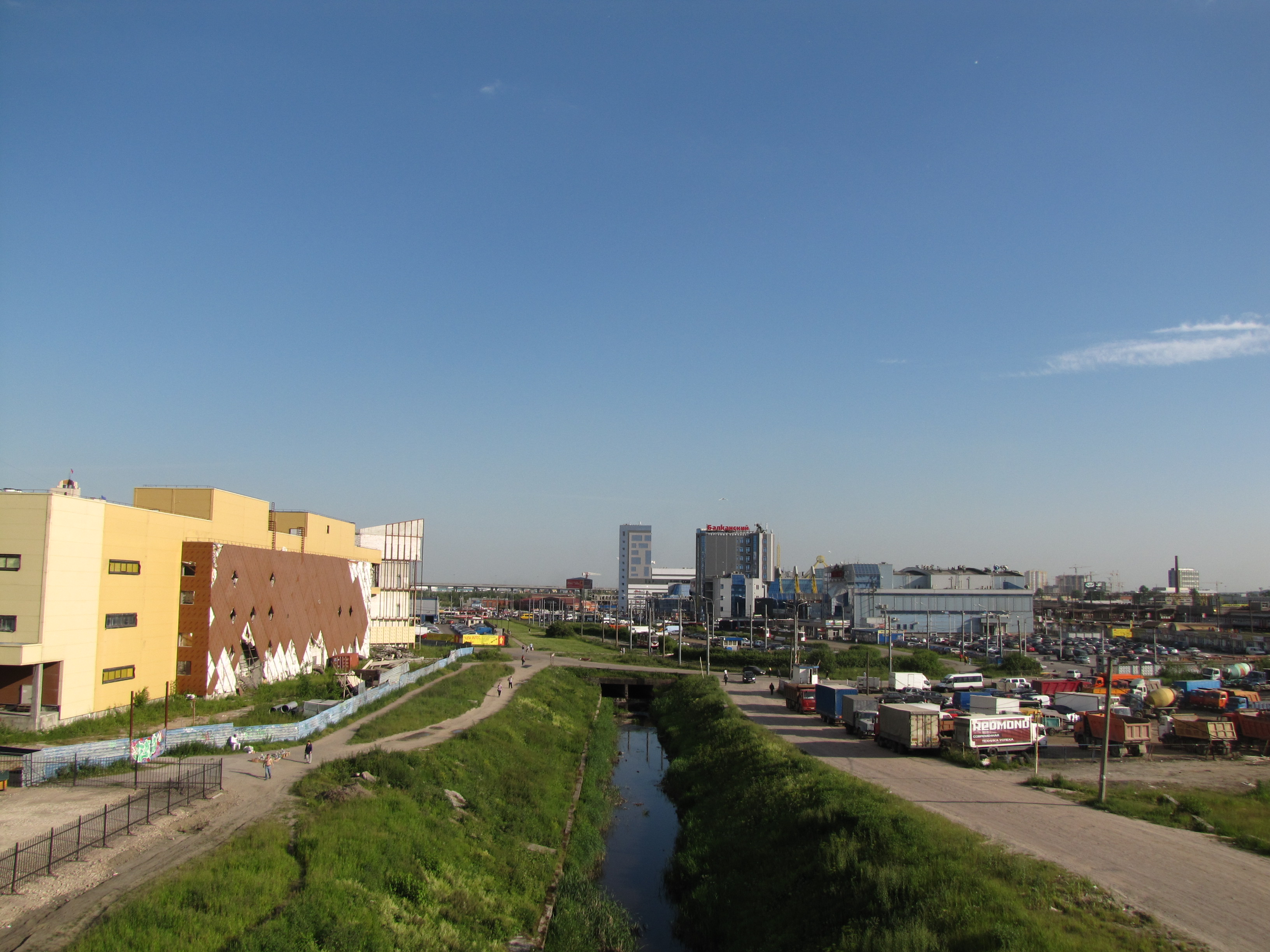
- Over Volkovka, Frunzensky District
- Frunzensky District on the 2006 map of St. Petersburg
- Coordinates: 59°52′N 30°24′E
- Country: Russia
- Federal subject: federal city of St. Petersburg
- Established: April 1936
- Administrative center: Kupchino

Area
  - Total: 37.469 km^{2} (14.467 sq mi)

Population (2010 Census)
  - Total: 401,779
  - Density: 10,723/km^{2} (27,772/sq mi)
- Website: http://umvd-frunz.ru

Frunzensky District (Russian: Фру́нзенский райо́н) is a district of the federal city of St. Petersburg, Russia. As of the 2010 Census, its population was 401,779; down from 405,274 recorded in the 2002 Census.

== History ==
The district was established in April 1936.

In November 2017, it was proposed to rename the Frunzensky District into in Kupchinsky District (according to its historical name) in the course of the struggle against revolutionary names. However, the proposals were mostly ignored and not supported by locals.

== Municipal divisions ==
Frunzensky District comprises the following six municipal okrugs:

- #72
- Aleksandrovsky
- Balkansky
- Georgiyevsky
- Kupchino
- Volkovskoye
