= Petrogradsky District =

District in St. Petersburg, Russia

Coordinates: 59°57′N 30°18′E

Petrogradsky District on the older map of St. Petersburg

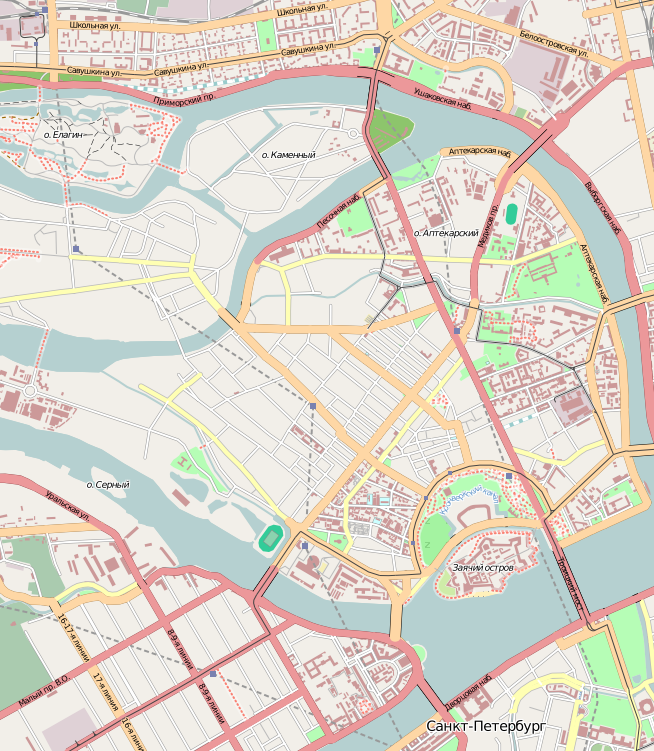
Close-up of Petrogradsky District

Petrogradsky District (Russian: Петрогра́дский райо́н) is a district of the federal city of St. Petersburg, Russia. It borders the Bolshaya Nevka River in the north and in the east, the Neva River in the south, and areas around the Malaya Neva River in the west. District's population: 130,455 (2010 census); 134,607 (2002 census).

Petrogradsky District comprises the following municipal okrugs:

- Aptekarsky Ostrov
- Chkalovskoye
- Kronverkskoye
- Petrovsky
- Posadsky
- Vvedensky

== History ==
Development of what would become the Petrogradsky District began in May 1703 when Peter the Great began construction of the Peter and Paul fortress on Zayachy Island. Under Peter the Great, Petrogradsky district became the commercial and administrative center of Saint Petersburg. It was under Peter the Great that Gorodskoy Island (today Petrogradsky Island) emerged as St. Petersburg's commercial and administrative center. It was settled over time by craftsmen and military men, prospering and becoming more populated through the 19th and early 20th centuries. The present district was formed in 1917, with the Primorsky District being split off in 1936. The current boundaries date back to 1973.

Even today, Petrogradsky District is a desirable location for commercial and residential real estate.
