= Central constituency (Saint Petersburg) =

Russian legislative constituency in Saint Petersburg

Central single-member constituency
- Constituency of the Russian State Duma
- Deputy: Aleksandr Amelin; United Russia
- Federal subject: Saint Petersburg
- Districts: Admiralteysky (Admiralteysky, Kolomna, Yekateringofsky), Kirovsky, Vasileostrovsky
- Voters: 454,166 (2026)

The Central constituency (No.216 (Note: No.210 in 1993-1995, No.211 in 1995-2007)) is a Russian legislative constituency in Saint Petersburg. The constituency covers west-central part of the city as well as mostly industrial and dense residential Kirovsky District to the south.

The constituency has been represented since 2026 by United Russia deputy Aleksandr Amelin, Young Guard of United Russia chief of staff, who won the open seat, succeeding one-term United Russia incumbent Sergey Solovyov.

== Boundaries ==
1993–1995: Oktyabrsky District, (Note: merged with Leninsky District into Admiralteysky District in 1994) Tsentralny District, (Note: created in 1994 from Dzerzhinsky, Kuybyshevsky and Smolninsky districts) Vasileostrovsky District
The constituency was based in central Saint Petersburg, covering most of the downtown.

1995–2003: Kalininsky District (part of Grazhdanka, part of Akademicheskoye, Finlyandsky, part of Piskaryovka), Petrogradsky District, Tsentralny District
Following the 1995 redistricting, the constituency was significantly changed, losing its portion of Admiralteysky District and all of Vasileostrovsky District to new Admiralteysky constituency. This seat instead gained Petrogradsky District to its north from North-Western constituency and eastern part of Kalininsky District from Northern and North-Eastern constituencies.

2003–2007: Kalininsky District (Grazhdanka, Finlyandsky, Piskaryovka), Petrogradsky District, Tsentralny District
After the 2003 redistricting the constituency was slightly altered, swapping its portion of Akademicheskoye Municipal Okrug for parts of Grazhdanka and Piskaryovka municipal okrugs in Kalininsky District with Northern constituency.

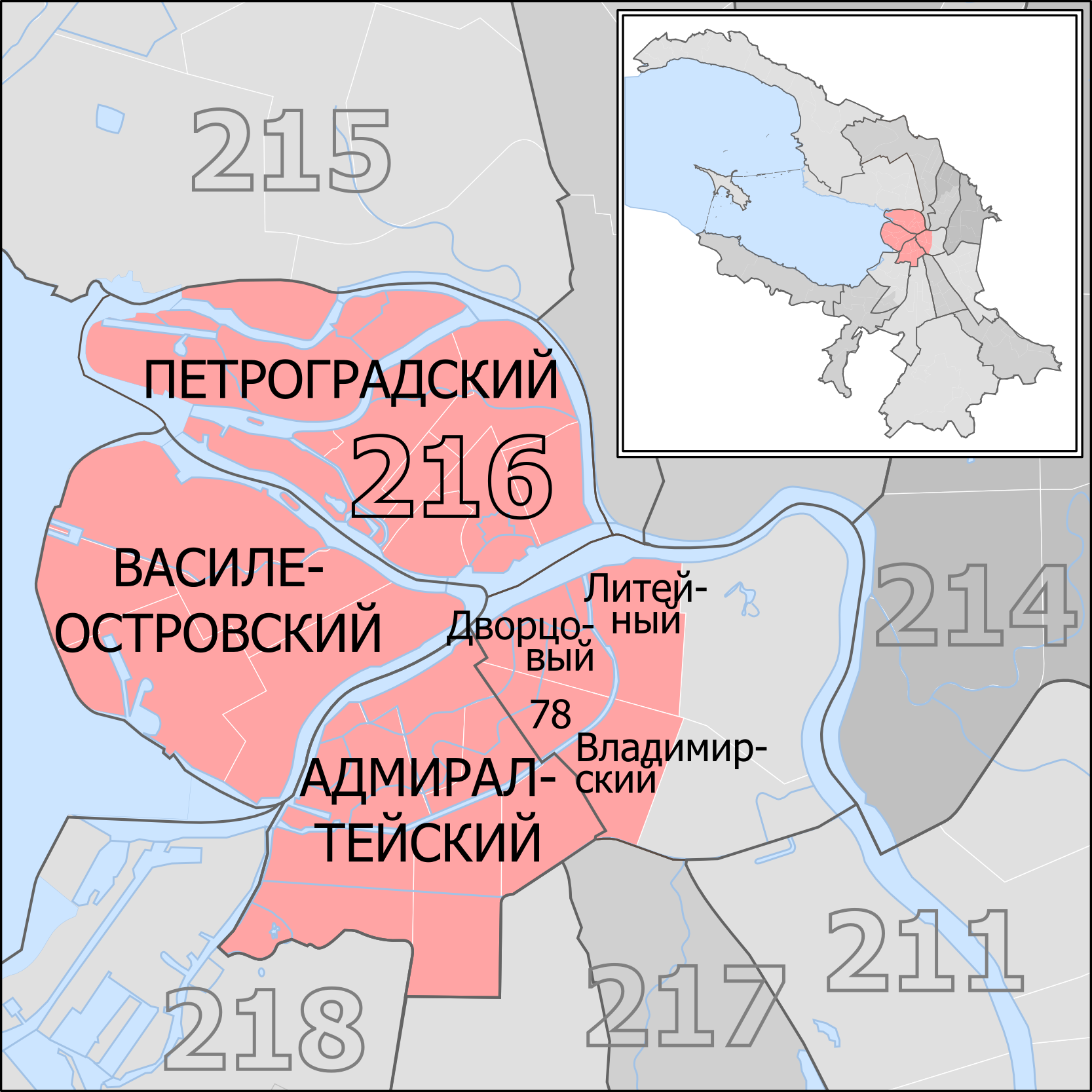
Constituency boundaries from 2016 to 2026

2016–2026: Admiralteysky District, Petrogradsky District, Tsentralny District (Municipal Okrug 78, Dvortsovy, Liteyny, Vladimirsky), Vasileostrovsky District
The constituency was re-created for the 2016 election and retained only Petrogradsky District and western Tsentralny District, losing its portion of Kalininsky District to Northern constituency as well as western Tsentralny District – to Eastern constituency. This seat instead gained Admiralteysky and Vasileostrovsky districts from the dissolved Admiralteysky constituency.

2026–present: Admiralteysky District (Admiralteysky, Kolomna, Yekateringofsky), Kirovsky District, Vasileostrovsky District
The constituency was significantly changed following the 2025 redistricting, losing Petrogradsky District and north-eastern part of Tsentralny District to Northern constituency, eastern half of Admiralteysky District – to Southern constituency, while the rest of Tsetralny District was moved into South-Eastern constituency. This seat instead all of Kirovsky District to its south from Western and Southern constituencies.

== Members elected ==
Election	Member	Party
1993	Aleksandr Nevzorov	Independent
1995	Pyotr Shelishch (Note: elected to the Civic Chamber of the Russian Federation in November 2007)	Independent
1999	Pyotr Shelishch	Independent
2003	Pyotr Shelishch	Independent
2007	Proportional representation - no election by constituency	
2011	Proportional representation - no election by constituency	
2016	Vladimir Bortko	Communist Party
2021	Sergey Solovyov	United Russia
2026	Aleksandr Amelin	United Russia

== Election results ==
=== 1993 ===
Summary of the 12 December 1993 Russian legislative election in the Central constituency
Candidate	Party	Votes	%
Aleksandr Nevzorov	Independent	65,619	27.01%
Yury Vdovin	Independent	~62,000	25.60%
Yury Nesterov	Yavlinsky—Boldyrev—Lukin	~19,000	–
Gennady Shuklin	Russian Democratic Reform Movement	~17,000	–
Yury Shutov	Independent	~13,500	–
Andrey Chernov	Choice of Russia	–	–
Vyacheslav Marychev	Liberal Democratic Party	–	–
against all		~51,000	–
Total		242,954	100%
Registered voters/turnout		~485,300	50.06%

=== 1995 ===
Summary of the 17 December 1995 Russian legislative election in the Central constituency
Candidate	Party	Votes	%
Pyotr Shelishch	Independent	57,389	20.99%
Arkady Kramarev	Pamfilova–Gurov–Lysenko	39,625	14.49%
Nikita Ananov	Independent	30,759	11.25%
Aleksey Vorontsov	Independent	21,545	7.88%
Yury Shutov	Independent	20,764	7.59%
Yevgeny Kozlov	Communists and Working Russia - for the Soviet Union	16,000	5.85%
Nikolay Arzhannikov	Transformation of the Fatherland	14,134	5.17%
Mikhail Kiselyov (incumbent) (Note: redistricted from Northern constituency)	Independent	8,556	3.13%
Anatoly Yemets	Congress of Russian Communities	8,155	2.98%
Valery Sokolov	Independent	6,501	2.38%
Leonid Rogozin	Independent	1,683	0.62%
Andrey Sabor	Independent	1,605	0.59%
against all		39,992	14.63%
Total		273,443	100%

=== 1999 ===
Summary of the 19 December 1999 Russian legislative election in the Central constituency
Candidate	Party	Votes	%
Pyotr Shelishch (incumbent)	Independent	40,420	18.30%
Anatoly Sobchak	Independent	36,355	16.46%
Andrey Ananov	Fatherland – All Russia	34,315	15.54%
Yelena Drapeko	Communist Party	26,331	11.92%
Vyacheslav Shevchenko	Independent	14,684	6.65%
Yury Shutov	Independent	14,507	6.57%
Lyudmila Yermolayeva	Liberal Democratic Party	8,915	4.04%
Faig Askerov	Independent	3,199	1.45%
Mikhail Korobkov	Social-Democrats	1,330	0.60%
against all		38,368	17.37%
Total		220,863	100%

=== 2003 ===
Summary of the 7 December 2003 Russian legislative election in the Central constituency
Candidate	Party	Votes	%
Pyotr Shelishch (incumbent)	Independent	53,708	29.66%
Nikita Ananov	Independent	25,035	13.82%
Yury Shutov	Independent	14,024	7.74%
Ivan Sabilo	Communist Party	12,061	6.66%
Valery Papshev	Independent	10,893	6.01%
Andrey Sharonov	Independent	9,999	5.52%
Aleksey Maksimov	Independent	9,483	5.24%
Nikolay Nazha	Development of Enterprise	6,894	3.81%
Sergey Tikhomirov	Liberal Democratic Party	6,306	3.48%
against all		30,459	16.82%
Total		181,414	100%

=== 2016 ===
Summary of the 18 September 2016 Russian legislative election in the Central constituency
Candidate	Party	Votes	%
Vladimir Bortko	Communist Party	34,167	23.88%
Maksim Reznik	Party of Growth	24,062	16.82%
Boris Paykin	Liberal Democratic Party	23,011	16.08%
Nikolay Rybakov	Yabloko	18,974	13.26%
Sergey Popov	A Just Russia	14,473	10.11%
Arkady Chaplygin	People's Freedom Party	4,842	3.38%
Aleksandr Startsev	The Greens	4,832	3.38%
Pavel Spivachevsky	Rodina	4,701	3.29%
Galina Kirichenko	Civic Platform	3,473	2.43%
Vitaly Glavatsky	Communists of Russia	3,183	2.22%
Total		143,097	100%

=== 2021 ===
Summary of the 17-19 September 2021 Russian legislative election in the Central constituency
Candidate	Party	Votes	%
Sergey Solovyov	United Russia	55,272	34.03%
Boris Vishnevsky	Yabloko	37,438	23.05%
Mikhail Bogdanov	A Just Russia — For Truth	11,450	7.05%
Gennady Denisov	Communist Party	11,153	6.87%
Aleksey Kovalyov	Party of Growth	11,087	6.83%
Darya Sadovskaya	New People	8,909	5.49%
Yekaterina Lebedeva	Liberal Democratic Party	5,761	3.55%
Gennady Detkov	Party of Pensioners	4,834	2.98%
Boris Vishnevsky	The Greens	3,352	2.06%
Gennady Makoyev	Communists of Russia	2,713	1.67%
Andrey Ivanov	Rodina	2,230	1.37%
Aleksey Terekhov	Green Alternative	1,371	0.84%
Sergey Ivanov	Civic Platform	884	0.54%
Total		162,401	100%

=== 2026 ===
Summary of the 18-20 September 2026 Russian legislative election in the Central constituency
Candidate	Party	Votes	%
Aleksandr Amelin	United Russia	128,746	53.29%
Yury Kulikov	New People	24,415	10.11%
Sergey Lovenetsky	Communist Party	22,901	9.48%
Aleksandr Ustimenko	Liberal Democratic Party	22,061	9.13%
Dmitry Anisimov	Yabloko	16,804	6.96%
Kristina Cheremnykh	The Greens	13,878	5.74%
Ilya Shmakov	A Just Russia	9,969	4.13%
Total		241,597	100%
