= Admiralteysky constituency =

Russian legislative constituency

Admiralteysky single-member constituency
- Constituency of the Russian State Duma

- Constituency boundaries from 2003 to 2007
- Deputy: None
- Federal subject: Saint Petersburg
- Districts: Admiralteysky, Kirovsky (Avtovo, parts of Dachnoye, Knyazhevo, Krasnenkaya Rechka, Morskiye Vorota, Narvsky), Vasileostrovsky
- Voters: 457,395 (2003)

The Admiralteysky constituency (No.206) was a Russian legislative constituency in central Saint Petersburg in 1995–2007. It included Admiralteysky District, Vasileostrovsky District and parts of Kirovsky District. The seat was last occupied by United Russia faction member Andrey Benin, a forestry industry lobbyist, who defeated incumbent three-term State Duma member and prominent human rights activist Yuly Rybakov in the 2003 election.

The constituency was dissolved in 2007 when State Duma adopted full proportional representation for the next two electoral cycles. Admiralteysky constituency was not re-established for the 2016 election, currently most of former Admiralteysky constituency is part of Central constituency, while Kirovsky District portion was put into Southern constituency.

== Boundaries ==
1995–2003: Admiralteysky District, Kirovsky District (Municipal Okrug 25, part of Municipal Okrug 27, Avtovo, Narvsky, Municipal Okrug 31), Vasileostrovsky District
The constituency was created in the 1995 redistricting from most of former South-Western constituency, parts of Central (Vasileostrovsky District) and Western constituencies (parts of Kirovsky District). It covered Admiralteysky and Vasileostrovsky Districts of central Saint Petersburg as well as industrial waterfront of Kirovsky District, including the territory of massive Kirov Plant and its housing for workers.

2003–2007: Admiralteysky District, Kirovsky District (Municipal Okrug 25, Avtovo, Narvsky, Municipal Okrug 30, Municipal Okrug 31), Vasileostrovsky District
After the 2003 redistricting the constituency was slightly altered, swapping its portion of Municipal Okrug 27 for Municipal Okrug 30 with Western constituency.

== Members elected ==
Election	Member	Party
1995	Yuly Rybakov	Democratic Choice of Russia – United Democrats
1999	Yuly Rybakov	Union of Right Forces
2003	Andrey Benin	Independent

== Election results ==
=== 1995 ===
==== Declared candidates ====
- Vladimir Bentsianov (Independent), veterans rights advocate
- Viktor Bryzgalin (Independent), cossack activist
- Anatoly Butov (VOPDT), rector of Saint Petersburg State University of Water Communications (1993–present)
- Valery Chernyshev (Independent), journalist, writer
- Oleg Gapanovich (Social Democrats), former Member of Saint Petersburg City Council of People's Deputies (1990–1993)
- Andrey Grinbergas (PR), youth social club director
- Nikolay Ivanov (Independent), former People's Deputy of the Soviet Union (1989–1991)
- Bogatyr Kaparov (KRO), banker, businessman
- Vyacheslav Marychev (Derzhava), Member of State Duma (1994–present)
- Anatoly Potapov (K–TR–zSS), Baltic Shipyard foreman
- Yuly Rybakov (DVR-OD), Member of State Duma (1994–present)
- Kirill Sadchikov (LDPR), businessman
- Yury Savelyev (Independent), rector of Baltic State Technical University (1987–present)
- Anatoly Smirnov (Duma-96), lawyer
- Aleksandr Uskov (PRES), Eliseyev Emporium general director
- Vladimir Zhavoronkov (Forward, Russia!), chairman of the party regional office executive committee
- Stepan Zholovan (Independent), Deputy Military Commissioner of Saint Petersburg

==== Results ====
Summary of the 17 December 1995 Russian legislative election in the Admiralteysky constituency
Candidate	Party	Votes	%
Yuly Rybakov	Democratic Choice of Russia – United Democrats	77,322	26.90%
Nikolay Ivanov	Independent	58,698	20.42%
Anatoly Potapov	Communists and Working Russia - for the Soviet Union	24,900	8.66%
Yury Savelyev	Independent	11,643	4.05%
Anatoly Smirnov	Duma-96	9,406	3.27%
Bogatyr Kaparov	Congress of Russian Communities	8,300	2.89%
Vyacheslav Marychev	Derzhava	7,241	2.52%
Kirill Sadchikov	Liberal Democratic Party	6,741	2.35%
Anatoly Butov	Political Movement of Transport Workers	6,019	2.09%
Stepan Zholovan	Independent	5,955	2.07%
Vladimir Zhavoronkov	Forward, Russia!	5,426	1.89%
Aleksandr Uskov	Party of Russian Unity and Accord	4,841	1.68%
Vasily Chernyshev	Independent	4,517	1.57%
Vladimir Bentsianov	Independent	4,140	1.44%
Andrey Grinbergas	Frontier Generation	2,821	0.98%
Oleg Gapanovich	Social Democrats	2,266	0.79%
Viktor Bryzgalin	Independent	2,148	0.75%
against all		37,404	13.01%
Total		287,451	100%

=== 1999 ===
==== Declared candidates ====
- Vladimir Bashmachnikov (NDR), Member of State Duma (1996–present)
- Aleksandr Butenko (Independent), S. M. Kirov Military Medical Academy senior lecturer
- Anatoly Doniyakh (Independent), Chairman of the Municipal Okrug 5 Municipal Council (1998–present)
- Andrey Malakhin (RSP), attorney
- Valery Mikheyev (OVR), transportation executive
- Aleksandr Nevzorov (Independent), Member of State Duma (1994–present)
- Yuly Rybakov (SPS), incumbent Member of State Duma (1994–present), chairman of the Democratic Russia party (1999–present)
- Yury Savelyev (DPA), rector of Baltic State Technical University (1987–present), 1995 candidate for this seat
- Vitaly Schtager (Yabloko), businessman
- Sergey Tsyplyayev (Independent), Presidential Envoy to Saint Petersburg (1992–present), former People's Deputy of the Soviet Union (1989–1991)
- Valentin Zanin (KRO-Boldyrev), Deputy Chairman of the Saint Petersburg Committee on Economy and Industrial Policy (1999–present), 1956 and 1960 Olympic rower
- Gennady Zhirnov (RPP), businessman
- Gennady Zolototrubov (Independent), nonprofit president, 1996 Leningrad Oblast gubernatorial candidate

==== Withdrawn candidates ====
- Irina Greshnova (Independent), journalist
- Konstantin Logachev (Peace. Labour. May), Russian Orthodox Church official
- Dmitry Pershin (Kedr), Chairman of the Municipal Okrug 6 Municipal Council (1998–present)

==== Failed to qualify ====
- Aleksandr Shmonov (Independent), activist, who attempted to murder Mikhail Gorbachyov in 1990

==== Did not file ====
- Dmitry Alekseyev (Independent)
- Aleksandr Belyayev (Independent), former Member of Federation Council (1994–1996), 1996 gubernatorial candidate
- Gennady Danilov (Independent)
- Yury Fesik (Independent)
- Vladimir Mironov (Independent), former Member of Saint Petersburg City Council of People's Deputies (1990–1993)
- Galina Semyonova (Independent)
- Sergey Vasilyev (LDPR), party activist
- Igor Vorobyov (RKPP), composer, musician

==== Results ====
Summary of the 19 December 1999 Russian legislative election in the Admiralteysky constituency
Candidate	Party	Votes	%
Yuly Rybakov (incumbent)	Union of Right Forces	51,881	21.20%
Yury Savelyev	Movement in Support of the Army	29,858	12.20%
Vitaly Schtager	Yabloko	26,084	10.66%
Aleksandr Nevzorov	Independent	25,131	10.27%
Valery Mikheyev	Fatherland – All Russia	22,930	9.37%
Gennady Zhirnov	Party of Pensioners	19,990	8.17%
Valentin Zanin	Congress of Russian Communities-Yury Boldyrev Movement	11,021	4.50%
Sergey Tsyplyayev	Independent	10,041	4.10%
Aleksandr Butenko	Independent	6,718	2.74%
Gennady Zolototrubov	Independent	4,040	1.65%
Andrey Malakhin	Russian Socialist Party	1,909	0.78%
Vladimir Bashmachnikov	Our Home – Russia	1,458	0.60%
Anatoly Doniyakh	Independent	1,414	0.58%
against all		29,745	12.15%
Total		244,757	100%

=== 2003 ===
==== Declared candidates ====
- Sergey Andreyev (Independent), Member of Legislative Assembly of Saint Petersburg (1994–present), 1996 and 2000 gubernatorial candidate
- Milania Ausheva (Independent), attorney
- Aleksandr Belyayev (LDPR), driver
- Andrey Benin (Independent), forestry industry lobbyist
- Anatoly Danilchenko (Independent), pawnshop director
- Vitaly Kalinin (NPRF), former Member of Legislative Assembly of Saint Petersburg (1998–2002)
- Valentin Korovin (ORP Rus'), nonprofit president
- Dmitry Kuzmin (RKRP-RPK), journalist
- Mikhail Maystrenko (Independent), construction executive
- Valentin Mettus (Independent), former Vice Governor of Saint Petersburg (1996–1997)
- Yuly Rybakov (Independent), incumbent Member of State Duma (1994–present), 2000 gubernatorial candidate
- Yury Savelyev (Rodina), Member of Legislative Assembly of Saint Petersburg (2002–present), 1995 and 1999 candidate for this seat
- Yury Sevenard (Independent), former Member of State Duma (1994–1999), 1991 and 1996 gubernatorial candidate
- Aleksey Titov (SPS), businessman
- Vladimir Yudin (Independent), Member of State Duma (2001–present)
- Ivan Zakharov (Independent), Member of State Duma (2000–present)
- Mikhail Zlydnikov (PVR-RPZh), businessman

==== Withdrawn candidates ====
- Ilya Konstantinov (SDPR), former People's Deputy of Russia (1990–1993)

==== Did not file ====
- Vladimir Bolshakov (Independent), union leader
- Vladimir Bykov (KPR), nonprofit president
- Arkady Dinkevich (Independent), documentary screenwriter
- Nikolay Kozlov (Independent), retired lawyer, 2000 presidential candidate
- Yury Pomaskin (Independent), Pskov Polytechnic Institute associate professor
- Aleksandr Shishlov (Yabloko), Member of State Duma (1996–present), Chairman of the Duma Committee on Education and Science (2002–present)
- Vladimir Sivkov (Independent), mechanic
- Vladimir Stepanov (Independent), pensioner
- Vladimir Teryokhin (Independent), unemployed
- Viktor Timofeyev (Independent), Pskov Academic Drama Theatre chief locksmith

==== Results ====
Summary of the 7 December 2003 Russian legislative election in the Admiralteysky constituency
Candidate	Party	Votes	%
Andrey Benin	Independent	32,934	17.46%
Yuly Rybakov (incumbent)	Independent	31,626	16.77%
Sergey Andreyev	Independent	20,571	10.91%
Yury Savelyev	Rodina	19,532	10.35%
Aleksey Titov	Union of Right Forces	10,424	5.53%
Vladimir Yudin	Independent	8,289	4.39%
Vitaly Kalinin	People's Party	7,060	3.74%
Aleksandr Belyayev	Liberal Democratic Party	6,325	3.35%
Dmitry Kuzmin	Russian Communist Workers Party-Russian Party of Communists	6,168	3.27%
Milania Ausheva	Independent	4,408	2.34%
Yury Sevenard	Independent	4,236	2.25%
Mikhail Zlydnikov	Party of Russia's Rebirth-Russian Party of Life	3,250	1.72%
Ivan Zakharov	Independent	1,703	0.90%
Valentin Mettus	Independent	1,697	0.90%
Mikhail Maystrenko	Independent	1,214	0.64%
Valentin Korovin	United Russian Party Rus'	1,198	0.64%
Anatoly Danilchenko	Independent	234	0.12%
against all		26,012	13.79%
Total		189,037	100%
