= Kazansky District, Petrograd =

Former administrative division of Saint Petersburg

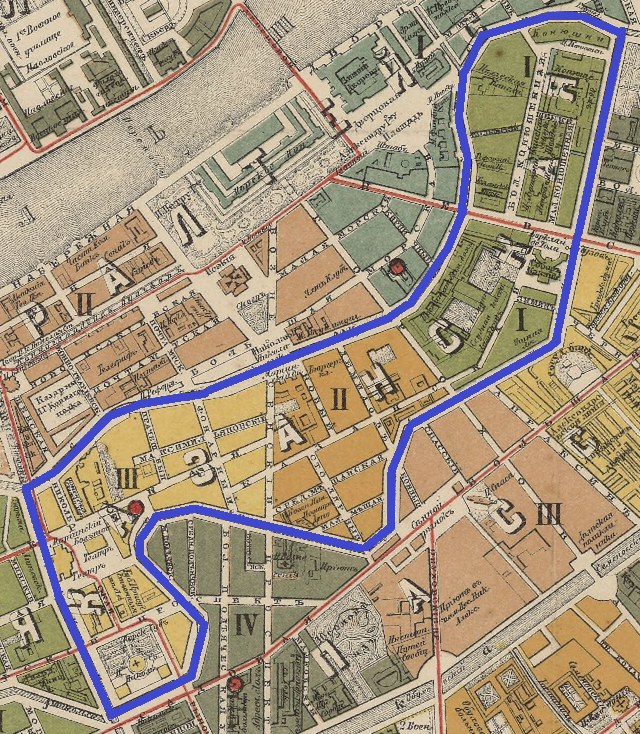
Map of the Kazanskaya Sector, late 1800s

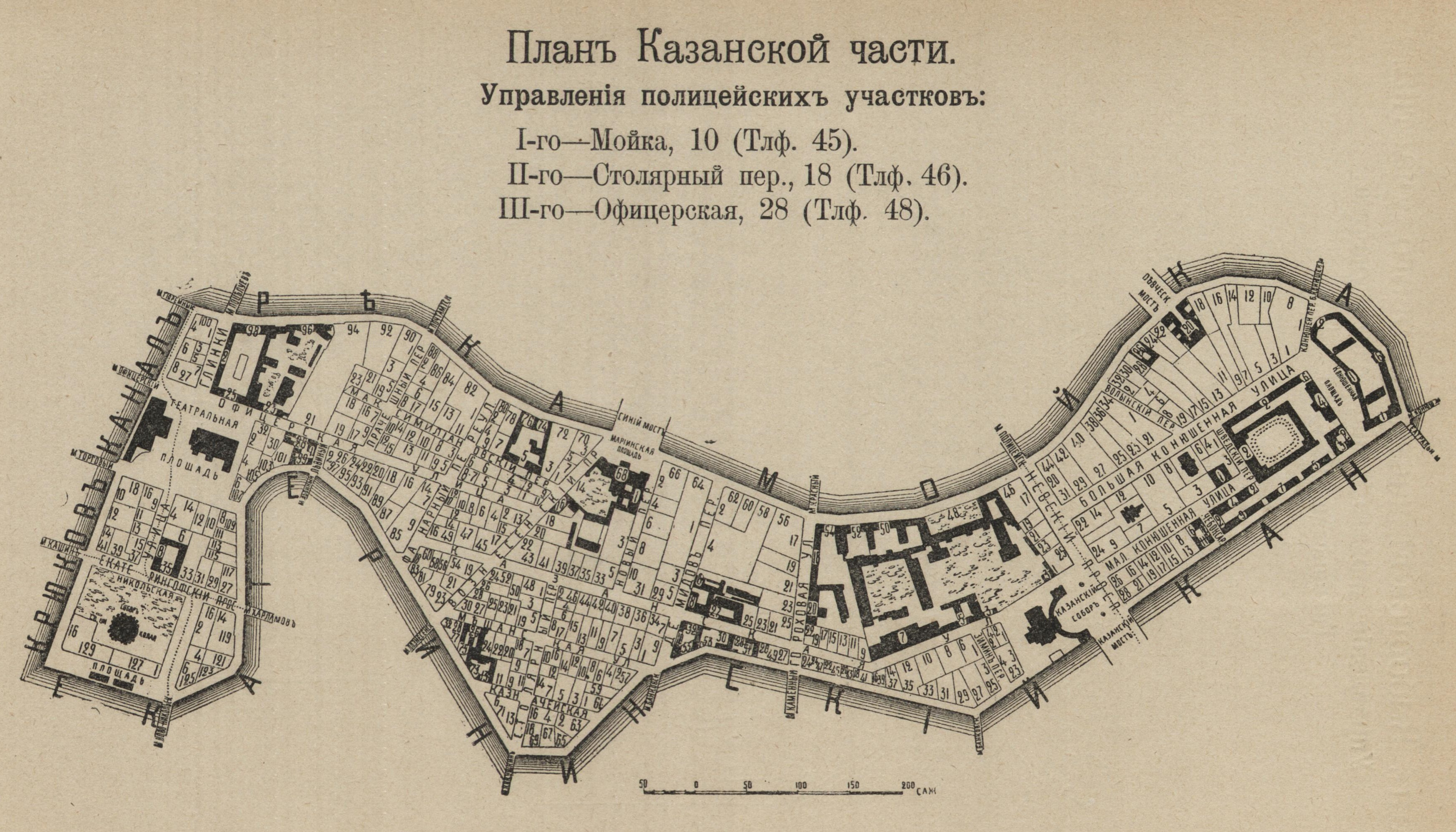
1910 map of the Kazanskaya Sector

The Kazansky District (Russian: Казанский район), initially the Kazanskaya Sector (Казанская часть), was an administrative division in the Russian capital Saint Petersburg/Petrograd from 1865 to 1917. As of the late 1800s and early 1900s it was an affluent area in the heart of the city. In 1917 a District Duma was elected and a soviet (council) was formed.

== Kazanskaya Sector ==
In February 1865 Saint Petersburg was divided into twelve police sectors. The Kazanskaya Sector was constituted on the areas of the erstwhile Second Admiralty Sector established in 1804. It was named after the Kazan Cathedral. The sector covered the Kazansky Island, surrounded by the Moyka River, the Yekaterinsky Canal and the Kryukov Canal.

The settlement of the north-eastern parts of the island had begun in the 1720s, as the non-Orthodox churches parishes were moved away from the neighbouring Admiralty Island. During the 1730s lands were assigned on the island for the construction of the Imperial Stables. The Imperial Stables and the non-Orthodox parishes began to constitute a small urban nucleus. The south-western parts of the island were would be settled by staff of the Admiralty Board, on initiate of the Commission on Saint Petersburg Construction to resettle individuals displaces by the Saint Petersburg fires of 1736-1737.

The Kazanskaya Sector bordered the Admiralty Sector to the north, the Spassky Sector to the south and the Kolomensky Sector to the west. The area emerged as bourgeois-aristocratic and governmental offices region in the heart of the imperial capital. An 1883 Baedeker travel guide described the Kazanskaya Sector as full of palaces and the most elegant shops.

== Precincts and neighbourhoods ==
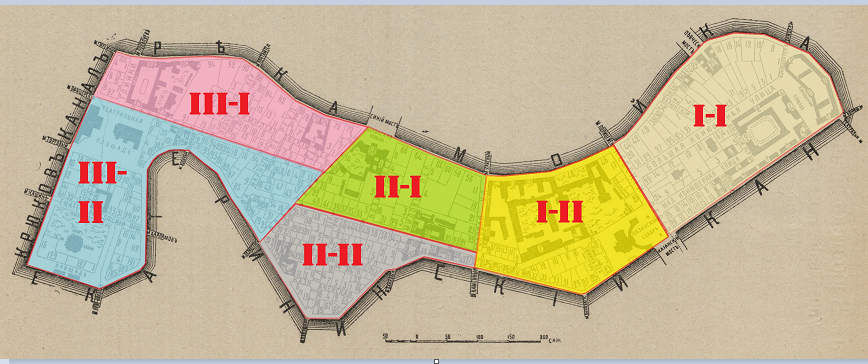
Neighbourhoods of Kazanskaya Sector

The Kazanskaya Sector was divided into three police precincts, each of which were divided into two neighbourhoods. The First Neighbourhood of the First Police Precinct stretched from the north-eastern end of the island to the Nevsky Prospekt. The Second Neighbourhood of the First Police Precinct included the areas of the Kazanskaya Island between Nevsky Prospekt and Gorokhovaya Street.

The Second Police Precincts of the Kazanskaya Sector stretched from Gorokhovava Street to the Voznesensky Prospekt. The areas north of the Kazanskaya Street (initially named Bolshaya Meshanskaya Street) constituted its First Neighbourhood, whilst the area to the south of the Kazanskaya Street constituted the Second Neighbourhood.

The Third Police Precinct stretched from Voznesensky Prospekt to the western fringe of the island. Ofitserskaya Street constituted the boundary between the First (to the north) and the Second (to the south) Neighbourhoods of the Third Police Precinct.

== February Revolution ==
After the February Revolution, the erstwhile police sectors of the city were rebranded as districts but retained their geographic coverage. The Kazansky District was the site of the State Council, the Pre-Parliament, four banks, the Mariinsky Theatre, the Saint Petersburg Conservatory, the Third Rifle Regiment, the Nikolaevsky Cadet Corps, the Military Law Academy and the editorial offices of Pravda. Whilst the Kazansky District, like the neighbouring Admiralty and Spassky Sectors, had no large industries or industrial working-class population, there were many poor people living within its boundaries. Moreover, between April and December 1917 the population of the district increased rapidly.

== Kazansky District Soviet ==
The Kazansky District Soviet of Workers and Soldiers Deputies was founded on April 26 [O.S. April 13] 1917, at the initiaive of the chauffeurs' union. The Kazansky District Soviet had a Socialist-Revolutionary-Menshevik conciliatory political line. On May 1 [O.S. April 18] 1917 the Second City District Soviet was formed (merging the Kazansky and Kolomensky soviets), at the initiative of the Kazansky District Soviet. Subsequently the Kazansky District Soviet would become a sub-district soviet under the Second City District Soviet, but the Kazansky Sub-District Soviet would rarely hold meetings. The Kazansky Sub-District Soviet would disappear altogether in November 1917.

== Elections ==
In the May 1917 Kazansky District Duma election, 22,077 out of approximately 57,000 eligible voters cast their ballots. the Kadet Party got 9,382 votes, the Socialist Bloc (a list presented by the Soviet of Workers and Soldiers Deputies of the Second City District) got 9,253 votes, Bolshevik 2,219 votes, 927 votes for the House-Owners Committees and other lists 296 votes for the list of Employees in Educational Institutions. The Kadets got 22 seats in the Kazansky District Duma, 22 seats went to the Socialist Bloc (SRs and Mensheviks), the Bolsheviks won 5 seats, the House-Owners Committees won 2 seats and 1 seat went to the list of Employees in Educational Institutions.

The Kadet group in the District Duma consisted of V. O. Simonovich, A. I. Soldatenkova, A. P. Yanson, O. V. Kalugina, V. F. Mushnikov, S. M. Sorokin, I. N. Ordin, A. A. Fomin, V. I. Bushkovich, V. Z. Gavrilov, A. N. Yanchevsky, A. A. Kallantar, N. A. Obraztsov, M. A. Yanson, S. N. Altufyev, V. F. Emelianov, K. G. Laks, M. A. Golovkin, E. V. Umansky, V. A. Silnikov, V. Yu, Yavein and N. N. Petrov. The Socialist Bloc District Duma group included V. E. Vikiforov, S. K. Talaev, G. S. Taubin, G. N. Chubinov, V. I. Ignatiev, A. E. Landsberg and S. I. Binshtok. The Bolshevik District Duma members included Grigory Zinoviev-Radomyslsky and A. I. Ivanova. The House Owners Committee was represented by S. A. Semyannikov and A. I. Bulaventsev. N. A. Druganov represent the Employees in Educational Institutions list.

In the 20 August 1917 Petrograd City Duma election, the Kadets got 5,478 votes in the Kazansky District, the SRs 3,993 votes, the Bolsheviks 2,284 votes, Mensheviks 471 votes, the Trudoviks-Popular Socialists and Unity 395 votes and others 754 votes There was a significant phenomenon of voter absenteeism in the Kazansky District in this election.

In the 1917 Russian Constituent Assembly election the Kadets got 10,827 votes (48.17%) in the Kazansky District, Bolsheviks got 4,467 votes (19.88%), the SRs got 3,146 votes (14%), the Popular Socialists got 737 votes (3.28%), Catholic Christian Democrats 710 votes (3.16%), Orthodox 644 votes (2.87%), Menshevik Defencists 471 votes (2.10%), Orthodox Christian Democrats 395 votes (1.76%), Mensheviks 260 votes (1.16%), Cossacks 203 votes (0.90%), Women's League 187 votes (0.83%), Independent Union 166 votes (0.74%), SR Defencists 121 votes (0.54%), Unity 60 votes (0.27%), Ukrainians 26 votes (0.12%), People's Development League 18 votes (0.08%), Radical Democrats 17 votes (0.08%), Women's Union for the Motherland 13 votes (0.06%) and Socialist-Universalists 7 votes (0.03%). Kazansky District had the highest percentage share of both the Catholic and the Orthodox Christian Democratic lists of all the Petrograd districts. Moreover, the Kazansky had the second-highest Kadet vote percentage and second-lowest Bolshevik vote percentage of the Petrograd districts. Kazansky District was the sole district where the SRs had a higher vote percentage than the Bolsheviks.

== October Revolution ==
Following the October Revolution, the District Dumas disappeared and local governance was fully taken over by the District Soviets. The Second City District replaced the Kazansky District.
