= Western constituency (Saint Petersburg) =

Western single-member constituency
- Constituency of the Russian State Duma
- Deputy: Aleksandr Teterdinko; United Russia
- Federal subject: Saint Petersburg
- Districts: Krasnoselsky, Kronshtadsky, Petrodvortsovy
- Voters: 461,924 (2026)

The Western constituency (No.212 (Note: No.206 in 1993-1995, No.208 in 1995-2007)) is a Russian legislative constituency in Saint Petersburg. The constituency covers south-western Saint Petersburg, including its inner suburbs.

The constituency has been represented since 2021 by United Russia deputy Aleksandr Teterdinko, former Member of Legislative Assembly of Saint Petersburg, who narrowly won the open seat after defeating two-term United Russia incumbent Sergey Vostretsov in the primary.

== Boundaries ==
1993–1995: Kirovsky District (southern part), Krasnoselsky District, Lomonosov, Petrodvorets
The constituency covered south-western Saint Petersburg and its inner suburbs, including the historic towns Lomonosov (Oranienbaum) and Petrodvorets (Petergof).

1995–2003: Kirovsky District (Ulyanka, part of Dachnoye, Municipal Okrug 30), Krasnoselsky District, Lomonosov, Petrodvortsovy District
Following the 1995 redistricting the constituency was slightly changed, losing some precincts to new Admiralteysky constituency.

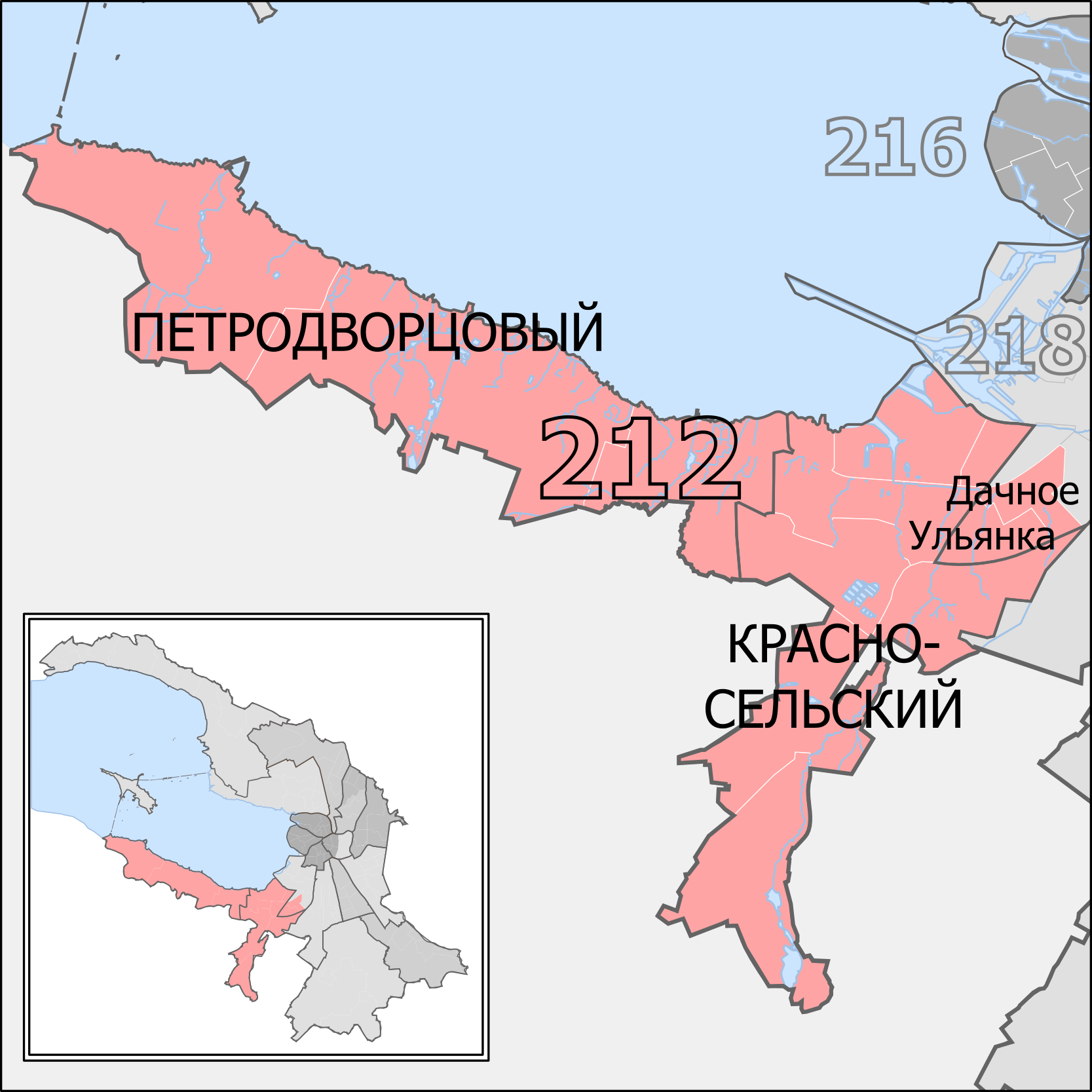
Constituency boundaries from 2016 to 2026

2003–2007, 2016–2026: Kirovsky District (Dachnoye, Ulyanka), Krasnoselsky District, Petrodvortsovy District
After the 2003 redistricting the constituency was slightly altered, swapping Municipal Okrug 30 for the rest of Municipal Okrug 27 with Admiralteysky constituency. This seat did not exist between 2007 and 2016 as State Duma was elected only through proportional representation.

2026–present: Krasnoselsky District, Kronshtadsky District, Petrodvortsovy District
The constituency was changed following the 2025 redistricting, losing its portion of residential Kirovsky District to Central constituency. This seat instead gained Kronshtadt from North-Western constituency.

== Members elected ==
Election	Member	Party
1993	Vitaly Savitsky (Note: died in a car accident in December 1995)	Choice of Russia
1995	Sergey Nikiforov	Yabloko
1999	Valentina Ivanova	Fatherland – All Russia
2003	Valentina Ivanova	United Russia
2007	Proportional representation - no election by constituency	
2011	Proportional representation - no election by constituency	
2016	Sergey Vostretsov	United Russia
2021	Aleksandr Teterdinko	United Russia
2026	Aleksandr Teterdinko	United Russia

== Election results ==
=== 1993 ===
Summary of the 12 December 1993 Russian legislative election in the Western constituency
Candidate	Party	Votes	%
Vitaly Savitsky	Choice of Russia	29,949	11.80%
Vladislav Scherbakov	Civic Union	25,606	10.09%
Oleg Semyonov	Independent	24,417	9.62%
Mikhail Dmitriyev	Party of Russian Unity and Accord	24,264	9.56%
Vladimir Solovyev	Independent	21,461	8.45%
Sergey Nikiforov	Independent	18,657	7.35%
Yevgeny Istomin	Independent	15,070	5.94%
Vladimir Konstantinov	Independent	14,667	5.78%
Yury Antonov	Independent	9,940	3.92%
against all		47,879	18.86%
Total		253,888	100%

=== 1995 ===
Summary of the 17 December 1995 Russian legislative election in the Western constituency
Candidate	Party	Votes	%
Sergey Nikiforov	Yabloko	53,034	18.78%
Viktor Kharchenko	Trade Unions and Industrialists – Union of Labour	37,850	13.40%
Yevgeny Krasnitsky	Communist Party	33,218	11.76%
Valery Filippov	Independent	22,368	7.92%
Aleksey Protasov	Communists and Working Russia - for the Soviet Union	12,027	4.26%
Igor Kucherenko	Stable Russia	11,423	4.05%
Yury Gladkov	Independent	10,320	3.65%
Vyacheslav Shestakov	Ivan Rybkin Bloc	9,411	3.33%
Taisia Rusinova	Party of Workers' Self-Government	8,227	2.91%
Sergey Kuznetsov	Liberal Democratic Party	7,073	2.50%
Valery Polosin	Congress of Russian Communities	6,452	2.28%
Yevgeny Istomin	Forward, Russia!	6,306	2.23%
Yevgeny Kirichenko	Bloc of Independents	5,632	1.99%
Sergey Kukharev	Pamfilova–Gurov–Lysenko	5,506	1.95%
Aleksandr Romanov	Independent	5,104	1.81%
Viktor Alekseyev	Russian All-People's Movement	4,211	1.49%
Aleksandr Kazartsev	Independent	2,773	0.98%
against all		33,885	12.00%
Total		282,388	100%

=== 1999 ===
Summary of the 19 December 1999 Russian legislative election in the Western constituency
Candidate	Party	Votes	%
Valentina Ivanova	Fatherland – All Russia	43,193	17.27%
Valery Nemets	Communist Party	31,771	12.70%
Sergey Nikiforov (incumbent)	Yabloko	29,693	11.87%
Ruslan Linkov	Union of Right Forces	29,481	11.79%
Aleksandr Vasilyev	Independent	24,565	9.82%
Boris Gladkikh	Congress of Russian Communities-Yury Boldyrev Movement	12,764	5.10%
Aleksandra Yakovleva	Independent	10,344	4.14%
Aleksandr Rubtsov	Party of Pensioners	7,789	3.11%
Vladimir Belozerskikh	Independent	6,542	2.62%
Yury Kiselev	Movement in Support of the Army	5,655	2.26%
Yevgeny Polyakov	Liberal Democratic Party	4,574	1.83%
Galina Silinsh	Andrey Nikolayev and Svyatoslav Fyodorov Bloc	3,920	1.57%
Vladimir Savitsky	Independent	2,468	0.99%
Vyacheslav Marychev	Independent	2,114	0.85%
Vladimir Zhavoronkov	Our Home – Russia	1,518	0.61%
Grigory Shapovalov	Spiritual Heritage	787	0.31%
Oleg Zharov	Independent	540	0.22%
against all		29,806	11.92%
Total		250,136	100%

=== 2003 ===
Summary of the 7 December 2003 Russian legislative election in the Western constituency
Candidate	Party	Votes	%
Valentina Ivanova (incumbent)	United Russia	66,424	32.05%
Igor Artemyev	Yabloko	63,020	30.41%
Vladimir Fyodorov	Communist Party	20,118	9.71%
Dmitry Likhachev	Party of Russia's Rebirth-Russian Party of Life	10,908	5.26%
Lyubov Yegorova	United Russian Party Rus'	9,056	4.37%
Igor Savelyev	Liberal Democratic Party	8,656	4.18%
Igor Onishchenko	Development of Enterprise	4,426	2.14%
against all		22,431	10.82%
Total		207,622	100%

=== 2016 ===
Summary of the 18 September 2016 Russian legislative election in the Western constituency
Candidate	Party	Votes	%
Sergey Vostretsov	United Russia	42,306	25.66%
Dmitry Ushakov	A Just Russia	19,690	11.94%
Olga Galkina	Party of Growth	19,397	11.77%
Aleksandr Olkhovsky	Communist Party	18,168	11.02%
Anna Zamarayeva	Liberal Democratic Party	17,344	10.52%
Andrey Palevich	Yabloko	11,858	7.19%
Aleksandr Baranyuk	The Greens	7,721	4.68%
Aleksey Gerasimov	Rodina	5,554	3.37%
Kermen Basangova	Communists of Russia	5,347	3.24%
Ilya Lvov	People's Freedom Party	4,298	2.61%
Vladimir Yedryshev	Patriots of Russia	2,488	1.51%
Vasily Tarsukov	Civic Platform	1,860	1.13%
Total		164,844	100%

=== 2021 ===
Summary of the 17-19 September 2021 Russian legislative election in the Western constituency
Candidate	Party	Votes	%
Aleksandr Teterdinko	United Russia	40,406	22.61%
Nadezhda Tikhonova	A Just Russia — For Truth	39,197	21.94%
Grigory Menshikov	Communist Party	18,390	10.59%
Tatyana Bulanova	Rodina	13,916	7.79%
Pavel Bragin	New People	12,475	6.98%
Tatyana Ivanova	Communists of Russia	9,243	5.17%
Pavel Itkin	Liberal Democratic Party	8,175	4.57%
Roman Guryev	Party of Pensioners	7,835	4.38%
Andrey Palevich	Yabloko	5,536	3.10%
Aleksandr Golovanov	Party of Growth	4,074	2.28%
Galina Savelyeva	Russian Party of Freedom and Justice	3,323	1.86%
Olesya Utkina	The Greens	2,915	1.63%
Olga Shestakova	Green Alternative	1,757	0.98%
Svetlana Kalugina	Civic Platform	1,175	0.66%
Total		178,690	100%

=== 2026 ===
Summary of the 18-20 September 2026 Russian legislative election in the Western constituency
Candidate	Party	Votes	%
Aleksandr Teterdinko (incumbent)	United Russia	136,554	55.32%
Gennady Denisov	Communist Party	26,596	10.77%
Aleksey Golovin	Liberal Democratic Party	24,906	10.09%
Nadezhda Tikhonova	A Just Russia	22,035	8.93%
David Zudin	Yabloko	20,994	8.51%
Olesya Utkina	The Greens	11,463	4.64%
Total		246,832	100%
