= Sennoy Municipal Okrug =

Coordinates: 59°55′30″N 30°18′49″E

Sennoy Municipal Okrug on the 2006 map of St. Petersburg

Sennoy Municipal Okrug (Russian: Сенно́й муниципа́льный о́круг) is a municipal okrug of Admiralteysky District of the federal city of St. Petersburg, Russia. Population: 22,384 (2010 census); 28,105 (2002 census).

It borders the Fontanka River in the south, Kryukov Canal in the west, Sadovaya Street and Voznesensky Avenue in the northwest, the Moyka River in the north, and Gorokhovaya Street in the east.

Places of interest include Hay Square, Garden Street, Griboyedov Canal, and the Yusupov Palace.
