= Sergey Soloviev (politician) =

Russian politician (born 1961)

Sergey Soloviev MP
- Сергей Соловьёв
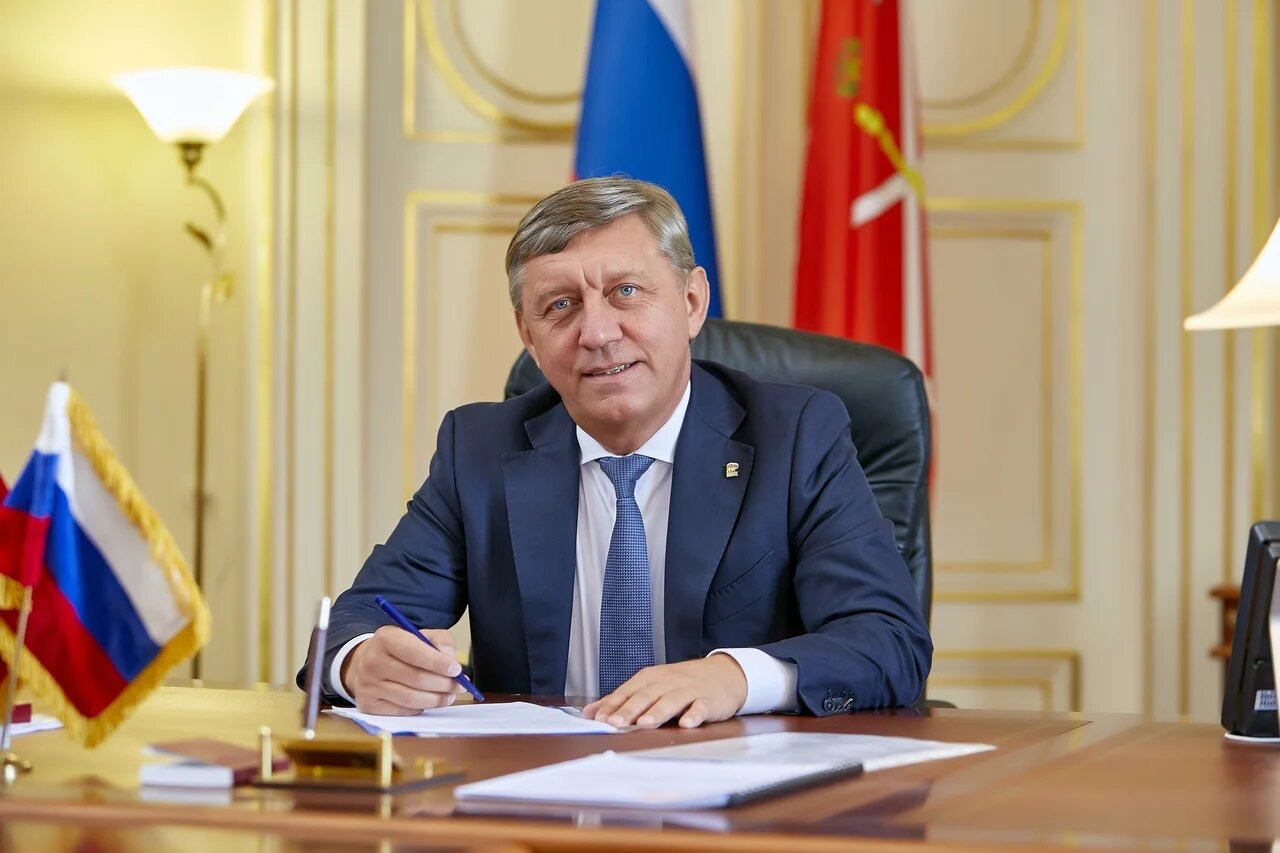

Member of the State Duma for Saint Petersburg
- Incumbent
- Assumed office 12 October 2021
- Preceded by: Vladimir Bortko
- Constituency: Central St. Petersburg (No. 216)

Personal details
- Born: 1 May 1961 (age 64) Leningrad, Russian SFSR, USSR
- Party: United Russia
- Education: Higher Political School of the Ministry of Internal Affairs of the USSR; Saint Petersburg State University of Economics and Finance

Sergey Anatolievich Soloviev (Russian: Сергей Анатольевич Соловьёв; 1 May 1961, Moscow) is a Russian political figure, deputy of the 8th State Duma.

From 1978 to 1985, Soloviev served at the Internal Troops of the Ministry of Internal Affairs of the USSR. In the 1990s, Soloviev worked as an administrator at the Leningrad branch of the Soviet cultural fund, commercial director of the Vesuvius LLP, and as president of the Interregional Fund for European Cooperation and Development. In 2000, he was elected deputy of the municipal council of the Admiralteysky District of Saint Petersburg. From 2004 to 2007, Soloviev served as deputy and as head of the Sennoy Municipal Okrug. In 2007–2011, he was the deputy of the Legislative Assembly of Saint Petersburg of the 4th convocation. In 2016, he was re-elected for the Legislative Assembly of Saint Petersburg of the 6th convocation. Since September 2021, he has served as deputy of the 8th State Duma from the Saint Petersburg constituency.
