= Galernyy Island =

Former island in Saint Petersburg, Russia

Coordinates: 59°55′01″N 30°16′15″E

Galernyy Island is a peninsula and former island in the mouth of the Fontanka River in Saint-Petersburg, Russia.

== History ==
Before the creation of the city, the island was a deep forest. The first known name for the island is Ukkossaari, which means "thunderous island" in the Finnish language, which was given to it at around 1675. During the construction of the city, it was given the name "Poganyy Island", which literally means "Horrid Island", which was a common name for islands and regions that had no permanent population and were used only for daily needs. In 1725, it was given the name of "Belin Island", which likely comes from the white beaches of the island.

In the beginning of the 18th century, the Gallernyy shipyard was created on the island, named after the galleys built there; today it is part of the Admiralty Shipyards.

In the 1960s, it became a peninsula of the larger Kolomenskyy island after one of the branches of the Fontanka River was buried.. The remaining region in the Fontanka river was named the "Big Dipper".

== Climate ==
The island has a continental climate. The median temperature is 4°C. It's hottest month is July, approximately 22°C, and it's coldest month is January, approximately -12°C.
