= Narvsky =

Narvsky (masculine), Narvskaya (feminine), or Narvskoye (neuter) may refer to:

- Narvsky Municipal Okrug, a municipal okrug in Kirovsky District of the federal city of St. Petersburg, Russia
- Narvskaya, a station of the St. Petersburg Metro, St. Petersburg, Russia
