= Admiralteysky Municipal Okrug =

Coordinates: 59.894°N 30.264°E

Admiralteysky Municipal Okrug on the older map of St. Petersburg

Admiralteysky Municipal Okrug (Russian: Адмиралте́йский муниципа́льный о́круг) is a municipal okrug of Admiralteysky District of the federal city of St. Petersburg, Russia. Population: 22,634 (2010 census); 30,533 (2002 census).

It borders the Neva River in the north, New Admiralty Canal and Kryukov Canal in the west, Fontanka in the south, and Voznesensky Avenue and the Moyka River in the east.

Places of interest include the Admiralty building, Saint Isaac's Cathedral, Mariinsky Palace, Decembrists Square, and Mariinsky Theatre.
