= Kolomna (disambiguation) =

Kolomna is an ancient city in Moscow Oblast, Russia

Kolomna may also refer to:

- Kolomna Municipal Okrug, a municipal okrug in Admiralteysky District of St. Petersburg, Russia
- Kolomna Kremlin, a fortress in Kolomna, Moscow Oblast, Russia
- Kolomna Bus Terminal, a bus terminal in Kolomna, Moscow Oblast, Russia

== See also ==
- Kolomensky District
