= Semyonovsky Bridge =

Bridge in Saint Petersburg, Russia

Semenovsky Bridge Russian: Семёновский мост
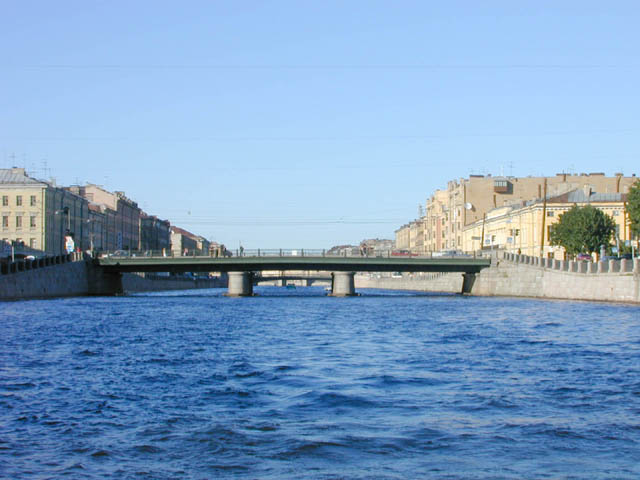
- Coordinates: 59.9252°N 30.3269°E
- Carries: traffic and pedestrian
- Crosses: Fontanka River
- Locale: Saint Petersburg

Characteristics
- Design: Arch Bridge
- Total length: 54.7 m
- Width: 19.5 m

History
- Opened: 1733 (wooden), 1788

Location
- Interactive map of Semenovsky Bridge; Russian: Семёновский мост

Semyonovsky Bridge or Semenovsky Bridge (Russian: Семёновский Мост) is a bridge across the Fontanka River in Saint Petersburg, Russia. It carries the Gorokhovaya Street. It was opened in 1733 as a wooden bridge and became one of the first bridges across Fontanka. The bridge was rebuilt in stone in 1788, presumably, by Jean-Rodolphe Perronet). In 1857 the dilapidated pillars were rebuilt by engineer Fyodor Enrold. Almost a century later, in 1949, the pillars and main beams were reinstalled in metal.

The bridge took its name from the Semenovsky Imperial Guard regiment barracks located nearby.

The area is home to many sightseeing boats going to the Winter Palace, Peter and Paul Fortress, Summer Garden, and the Church of the Savior on Blood.
