= Alexander Teterdinko =

Russian politician

Alexander Teterdinko MP
- Александр Тетердинко
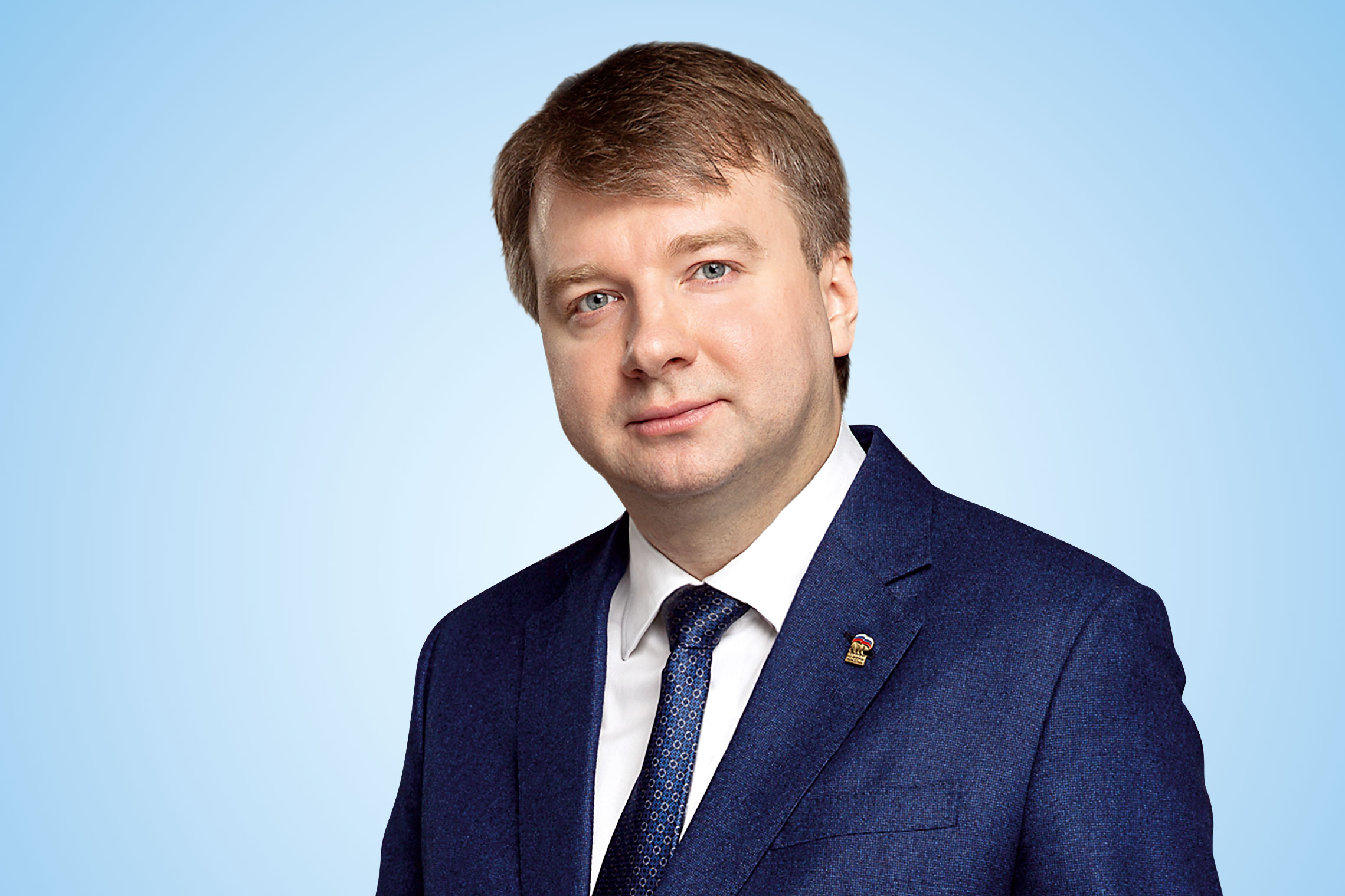

Member of the State Duma for Saint Petersburg
- Incumbent
- Assumed office 12 October 2021
- Preceded by: Sergey Vostretsov
- Constituency: Western St. Petersburg (No. 212)

Personal details
- Born: 20 November 1983 (age 42) Volkhov, Leningrad Oblast, Russian SFSR, Soviet Union
- Party: United Russia
- Education: Saint Petersburg State University

Alexander Pavlovich Teterdinko (Russian: Александр Павлович Тетердинко; born 20 November 1983, Volkhov, Leningrad Oblast, RSFSR, USSR) is a Russian politician. A member of the United Russia party, he served as deputy of the Legislative Assembly of Saint Petersburg from 2016 to 2021, where he headed the United Russia faction in the 6th convocation. Since 2021, he has been a deputy of the 8th State Duma. Due to his support for the Russian invasion of Ukraine, he is under sanctions imposed by several countries.

== Early life and education ==
Teterdinko was born on 20 November 1983 in Volkhov, Leningrad Oblast. In 2005, he received a bachelor's degree, and in 2007, a master's degree from the Faculty of Law of Saint Petersburg State University.

== Career ==
From 2007 to 2009, he was chairman of the Audit Commission of the Zvezdnoye municipal district. In 2009–2011, he headed the office of the municipal council in the same district. In 2011–2012, he worked as an aide to the governor of Murmansk Oblast and deputy head of the regional government's office.

=== Election commissions and administration ===
Since 2008, Teterdinko was a member of the Saint Petersburg Election Commission with voting rights. In March 2012, he became deputy chairman of the commission, serving until December 2014. In January 2015, he was appointed deputy chairman of the Legal Committee of the Saint Petersburg governor's administration. From December 2015 to September 2016, he served as acting head of the regional executive committee of the Saint Petersburg branch of United Russia.

=== Legislative Assembly of Saint Petersburg ===
From 2016 to 2021, Teterdinko served as a deputy of the 6th convocation of the Legislative Assembly of Saint Petersburg. He was deputy chairman of the Budget and Finance Committee, a member of the standing commission on Urban Economy, Urban Planning and Property Issues, and head of the United Russia faction. According to journalists, during his tenure he authored or co-authored 129 legislative initiatives.

=== State Duma ===
In September 2021, Teterdinko was elected deputy of the 8th State Duma from the Western single-mandate constituency No. 212 (Saint Petersburg). He became a member of the Committee on State Building and Legislation.

== Party activity ==
Teterdinko is a member of the presidium of the regional political council of the Saint Petersburg branch of United Russiaand serves as first deputy secretary of the regional branch.

== Personal life ==
Alexander Teterdinko is married and has a daughter.

== Sanctions ==
He was sanctioned by the UK government in 2022 in relation to the Russo-Ukrainian War.
