= Panteleymonovsky Bridge =

Bridge in Saint Petersburg, Russia

Coordinates: 59°56′32″N 30°20′19″E

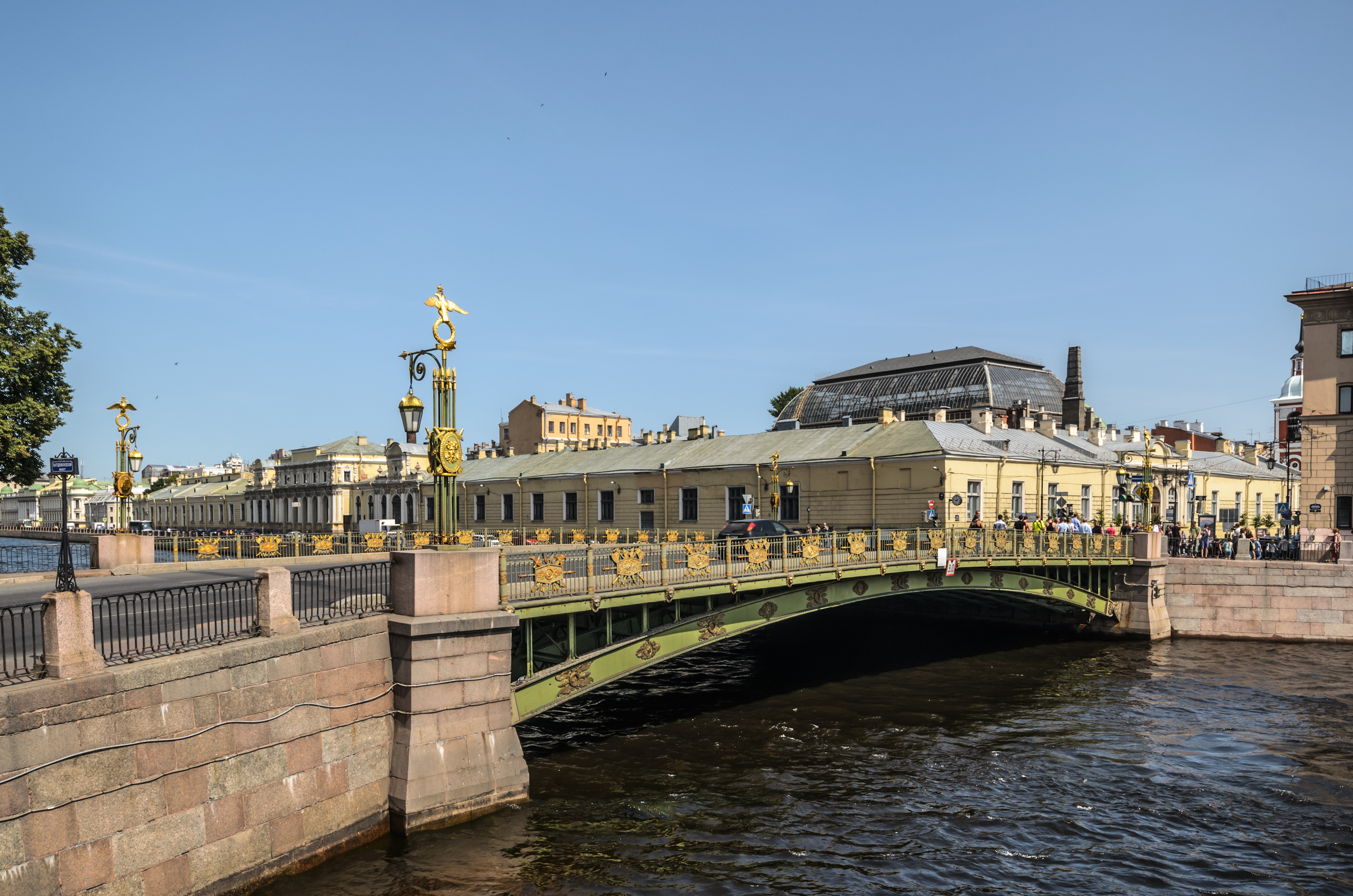
Panteleymonovsky Bridge

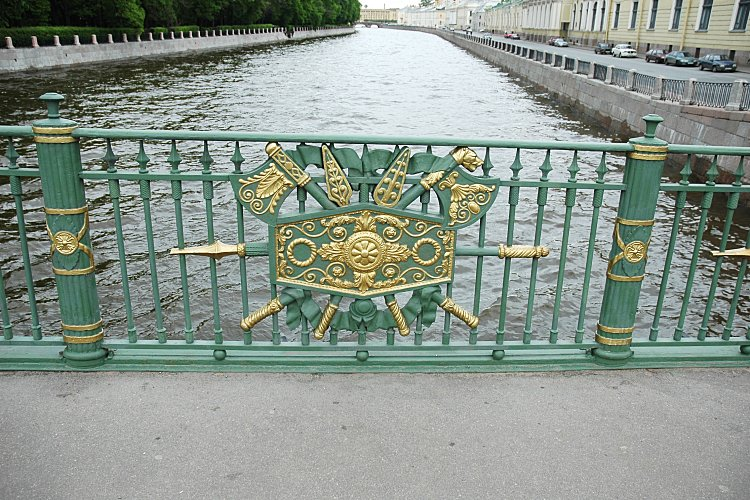
Railing detail

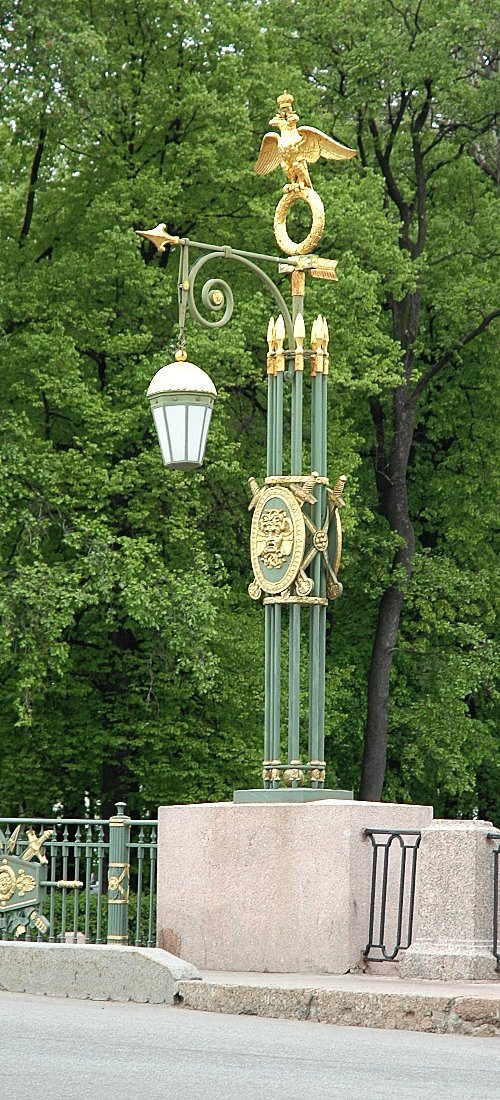
Lantern detail

Panteleymonovsky Bridge (Russian: Пантелеймо́новский мост) is a bridge across the Fontanka River in Saint Petersburg, Russia. The bridge was erected in 1823 and was named after Panteleymonovskaya Street (now Pestelya Street), which in turn was named after the nearby Church of St. Panteleimon (Pantaleon).

From 1915 until 1923 it was known as "Gangutskiy Bridge". In 1923 it was renamed as "Pestel Bridge" after Decembrist Pavel Pestel. In 1991 the original name was reinstated.

The bridge is located at the confluence of the Moika River and the Fontanka. It is 43 meters long and 23.7 meters wide.

== History ==
A wooden bridge stood in this location as early as 1725. In 1748 a Baroque-style bridge was built in its place designed by Bartolomeo Rastrelli. This last structure was damaged in the flood of 1777 and was demolished.

In 1823 a narrow suspension bridge ("chain bridge") was built by von Tretter and Khristianovich. In the beginning of the 20th century, it was widened and converted into an arch bridge by Ilyin and Pshenitskiy.
