= Yerik (term) =

Term for a shallow channel within river deltas

Yerik (Russian: ерик; Ukrainian: єрик, lit. 'shallow channel'), is a geographical term denoting a narrow, shallow channel or creek within river deltas, predominantly in the lower reaches of the Volga and other aquatic systems of southern Russia and the Caspian basin. These watercourses are characterised by a width of less than 30 metres and a depth that permits seasonal inundation during floods, forming an integral component of the intricate hydrographic network of deltaic landscapes. Yeriks function as connective links between major distributaries and broader waterways, facilitating the development of a labyrinthine web of channels, lakes, and vegetation typical of sediment accumulation zones.

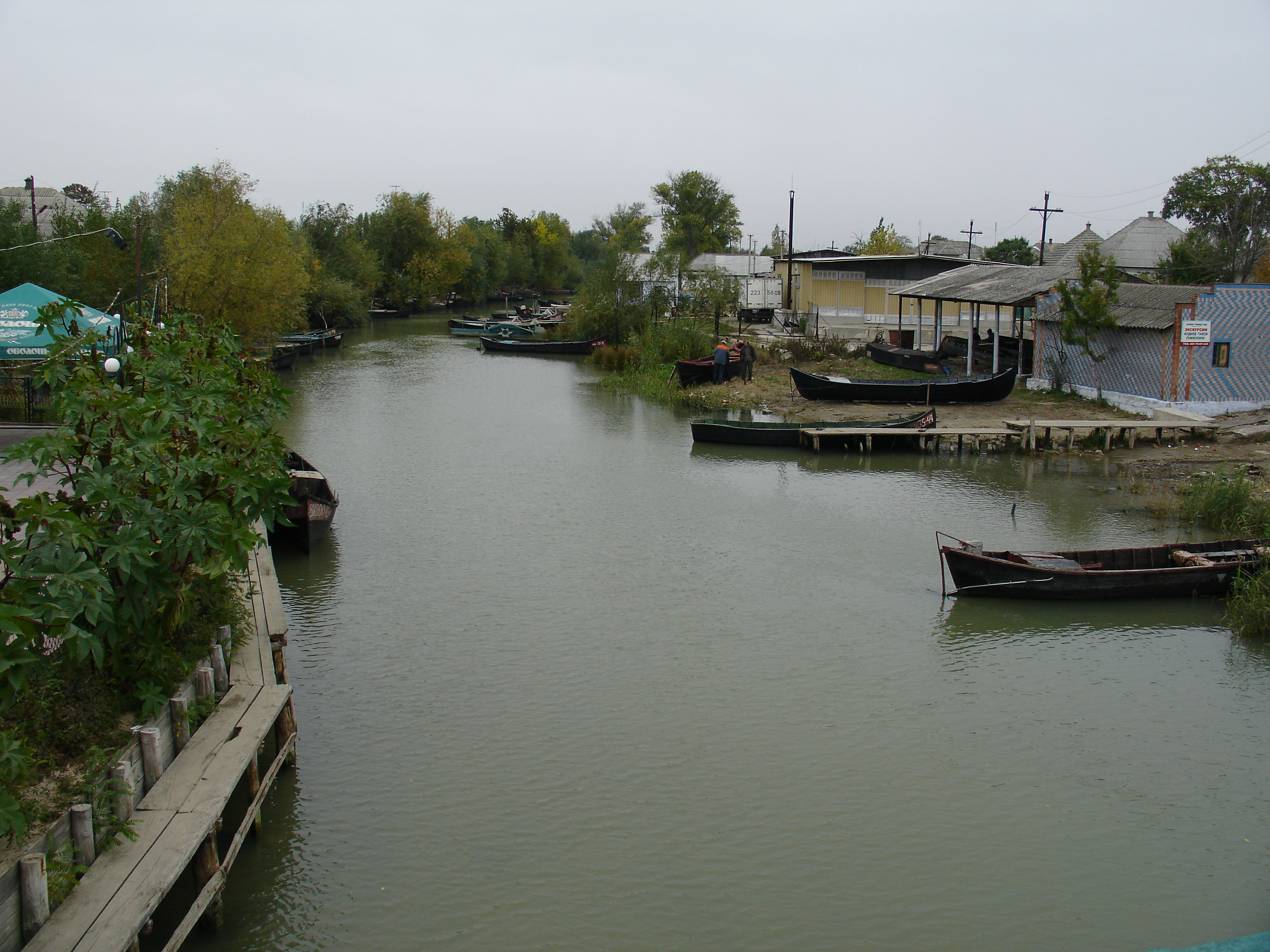
Yerik in Vylkove, Ukraine

== Etymology and terminology ==
The term yerik derives from Turkic origins, reflecting the influence of the peoples of the Volga and Caspian regions on the region's hydrography. In Anglophone scholarly literature, it is typically retained in transliterated form (erik) to emphasise its specificity, and employed in contexts of geomorphology, hydrology, and deltaic ecology. Unlike broader concepts such as distributary channel (a delta arm), the yerik underscores the localised, constricted nature of the watercourse, often associated with dry riverbeds or depressions that flood only during high-water periods.

== Geographical characteristics ==
Yeriks are emblematic of the littoral (lower) zone of river deltas, where fluvial aggradation and marine transgression engender a dense mesh of minor channels. In the Volga Delta – one of Europe's largest, extending approximately 300 km with an area exceeding 27,000 km² – yeriks are embedded within a hydrographic system encompassing major arms, minor streams, il'mens (shallow lakes), kul'tuks (freshwater marine bays), and bangas (large natural reservoirs at the delta's edge). As proximity to the Caspian Sea's shoreline increases, the channel network grows ever more ramified: the lower deltaic plain hosts about 223 watercourses, while the seaward margin features up to 900 outlets, some persisting as natural furrows or artificially deepened fairways. Yeriks, invariably shallow and narrow, aid in the seasonal dispersal of riverine waters and sediments, sculpting a variegated terrain adorned with lush aquatic flora, and their morphodynamics are profoundly shaped by tidal influences and sediment flux in the Caspian littorals.

== Ecological and scientific significance ==
Yeriks play a pivotal role in sustaining the biodiversity of deltaic ecosystems, mediating the conveyance of nutrients, silt deposition, and species migration. Within the Volga Delta, they serve as habitats for spawning and semi-anadromous fish (such as bleak, roach, bream, and perch), amphibians (pond frog), and mammals (beaver, muskrat), while nurturing plant communities, including thickets of triangular willow (Salix triandra) on bars at channel mouths. The Volga's regulated hydrological regime, governed by dams, accentuates the yeriks' reliance on floodwaters, rendering this dynamic essential to their systemic functioning and to fisheries; interannual variability in zooplankton and heavy metal accumulation further highlights their vulnerability to anthropogenic stressors.

In geological enquiries, yeriks feature prominently in palaeodelta reconstructions: stratigraphic profiling (as in sections at Aleksandrov Gay and Gorkiy Yerik) enables the chronometry of sediment accumulation epochs, spanning 15–40 thousand years to over 100 thousand years. As a prospective UNESCO World Heritage site, the Volga Delta illuminates the global import of yeriks in preserving singular deltaic topographies, imperilled by anthropogenic and climatic vicissitudes, with ongoing surveys underscoring their role in water quality assessment and invasive species dynamics.
