= Yekateringofsky Municipal Okrug =

Municipal division in Russia

Coordinates: 59°52′45″N 30°13′20″E

Yekateringofsky Municipal Okrug on the older map of St. Petersburg

Yekateringofsky Municipal Okrug (Russian: Екатеринго́фский муниципа́льный о́круг, known as Municipal Okrug #6 (муниципа́льный о́круг № 6) until 2011, is a municipal okrug of Admiralteysky District of the federal city of St. Petersburg, Russia. Population: 24,038 (2010 census); 31,570 (2002 census).

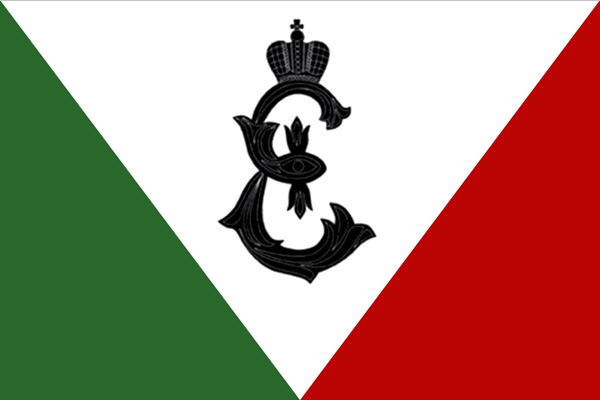
The flag of Yekateringofsky

It borders Fontanka in the north, Lermontovsky Avenue in the east, Obvodny Canal in the south, and Yekateringofka River in the west.
