= Voznesensky Prospekt =

Street in St. Petersburg, Russia

Coordinates: 59.9288°N 30.3082°E

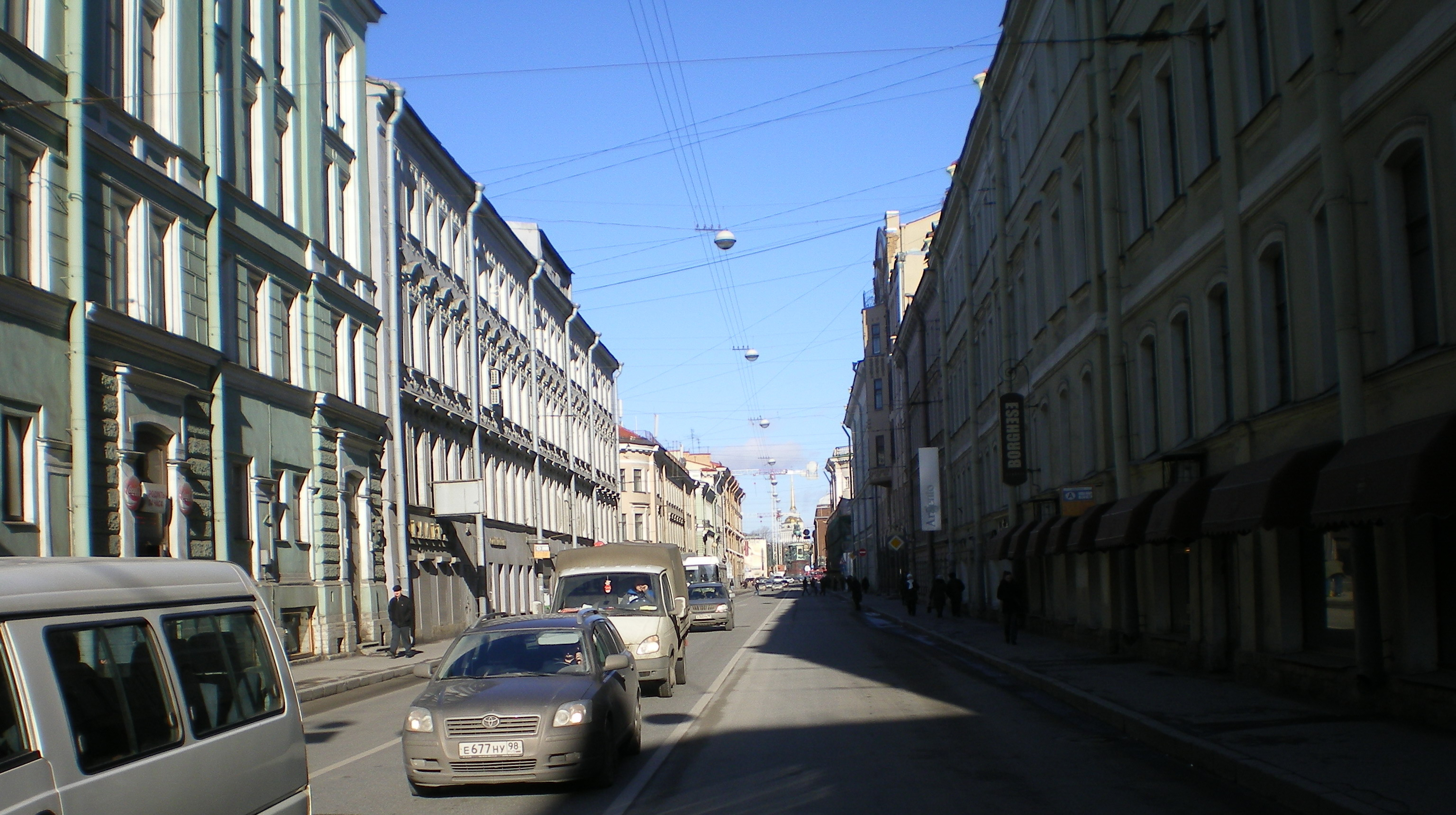
View to the beginning of the avenue from No. 11

Voznesensky Prospekt (Russian: Вознесенский проспект) is a 1.8-kilometre-long (1.1 mi) street in Admiralteysky District of Saint Petersburg, Russia. Crossing Saint Isaac's Square, the Moika (Blue Bridge) and Griboyedov Canal (Voznesensky Bridge), the street spans from Admiralteysky Prospekt to Izmaylovsky Bridge across Fontanka, where it turns into Izmaylovsky Prospekt. According to the city plan of 1737, the center of Saint Petersburg should develop along three radial axes meeting at the Admiralty's spire: Nevsky Prospekt, Gorokhovaya Street and Voznesensky Prospekt. From 1923 to 1991 the street was named Mayorov Prospekt (Проспект Майорова) after a prominent Bolshevik killed in the Russian Civil War.

== Notable buildings along the avenue ==
- Lobanov-Rostovsky Residence
