= Kolomna Municipal Okrug =

Coordinates: 59°55′20″N 30°16′50″E

Kolomna Municipal Okrug on the 2006 map of St. Petersburg

Kolomna Municipal Okrug (Russian: муниципа́льный о́круг Коло́мна) is a municipal okrug of Admiralteysky District of the federal city of St. Petersburg, Russia. Population: 39,164 (2010 census); 37,642 (2002 census).

== History ==
=== Scope ===
It borders the Neva River, New Admiralty Canal, and the Moyka River in the northwest, the Fontanka River in the south, and Kryukov Canal in the east.

=== Origin ===
The settlement areas of future Kolomna (the name is believed to have originated from Russified names of survey pillars - columns) was carried out after the fires in 1736 and 1737 devastated the Maritime and Admiralty settlement. Resettlement of people from these settlements gave rise to another version of the name. Perhaps, in the reign of Anna Ioannovna the formation of the names could influence the German language, in translation, from which the settler were called colonists, and the place they inhabited - a colony that Russian remade in its own way - Kolomna.

=== Occupation ===
The first inhabitants of Kolomna were mariners - artisans, pilots. Later there settled merchants, soldiers, tradesmen and, with few exceptions-poor gentry. The number of inhabitants in Kolomna continuously increased. In the middle of the 19th century, there lived about 50 thousand people in the mid-1890s - more than 70 thousand, and the census of 1910 indicates the number of inhabitants of Kolomna - more than 85 thousand.

=== Notable residents ===
- On the waterfront of Kryukov Canal there is a two-storey house #23. This house belonged to Dmitri Ivanovich Khvostov, the nephew of the great Russian military commander Alexander Vasilyevich Suvorov. Alexander V. settled in this house. May 17 Suvorov died in this house. At home, where he died in 1950, found a marble slab with a bas-relief of Suvorov and text: "In this house 6 May 1800 died the great Russian military leader Generalissimo Alexander Suvorov.
- Pushkin lived in Kolomna for three years in a house number 185, until he was exiled in 1820. In 1830 he wrote a poem "Domik v Kolomne" (in Cyrillic "Домик в Коломне"; known in English as "The Little House at Kolomna"). In the same house lived the brilliant architect Carlo Rossi, who died there in 1849.
- At Shopping street, in the fall of 1824 lived Alexander Griboyedov.

== Architecture ==
=== Typical buildings ===
The typical house of the Old Kolomna would be a moderate wooden house with a carved ridge under the roof and wood carvings under the windows, the perron with steps and the stairs with two flight of steps leading to the second floor.

=== Notable places ===
- Sadovaya Street
- Turgenev Square
- English Embankment
- Saint Petersburg Synagogue
- New Holland Island

== Streets ==
- Pastorova Street
