= Krasnenkaya Rechka Municipal Okrug =

Krasnenkaya Rechka Municipal Okrug муниципальный округ Красненькая Речка
- Municipal okrug
- Krasnenkaya Rechka Municipal Okrug on the 2006 map of St. Petersburg
- Coordinates: 59°52′N 30°15′E
- Country: Russia
- Federal city: St. Petersburg

Population (2010 Census)
  - Total: 40,544
- Website: http://www.красненькаяречка.рф

Krasnenkaya Rechka Municipal Okrug (Russian: муниципа́льный о́круг Кра́сненькая Ре́чка) is a municipal okrug in Kirovsky District, one of the eighty-one low-level municipal divisions of the federal city of St. Petersburg, Russia. As of the 2010 Census, its population was 40,544, up from 37,891 recorded during the 2002 Census.

It was formerly known as Municipal Okrug 30 (муниципальный округ №30).
