= Gorokhovaya Street =

Street in Tsentralny District, Russia

Coordinates: 59.9295°N 30.3205°E

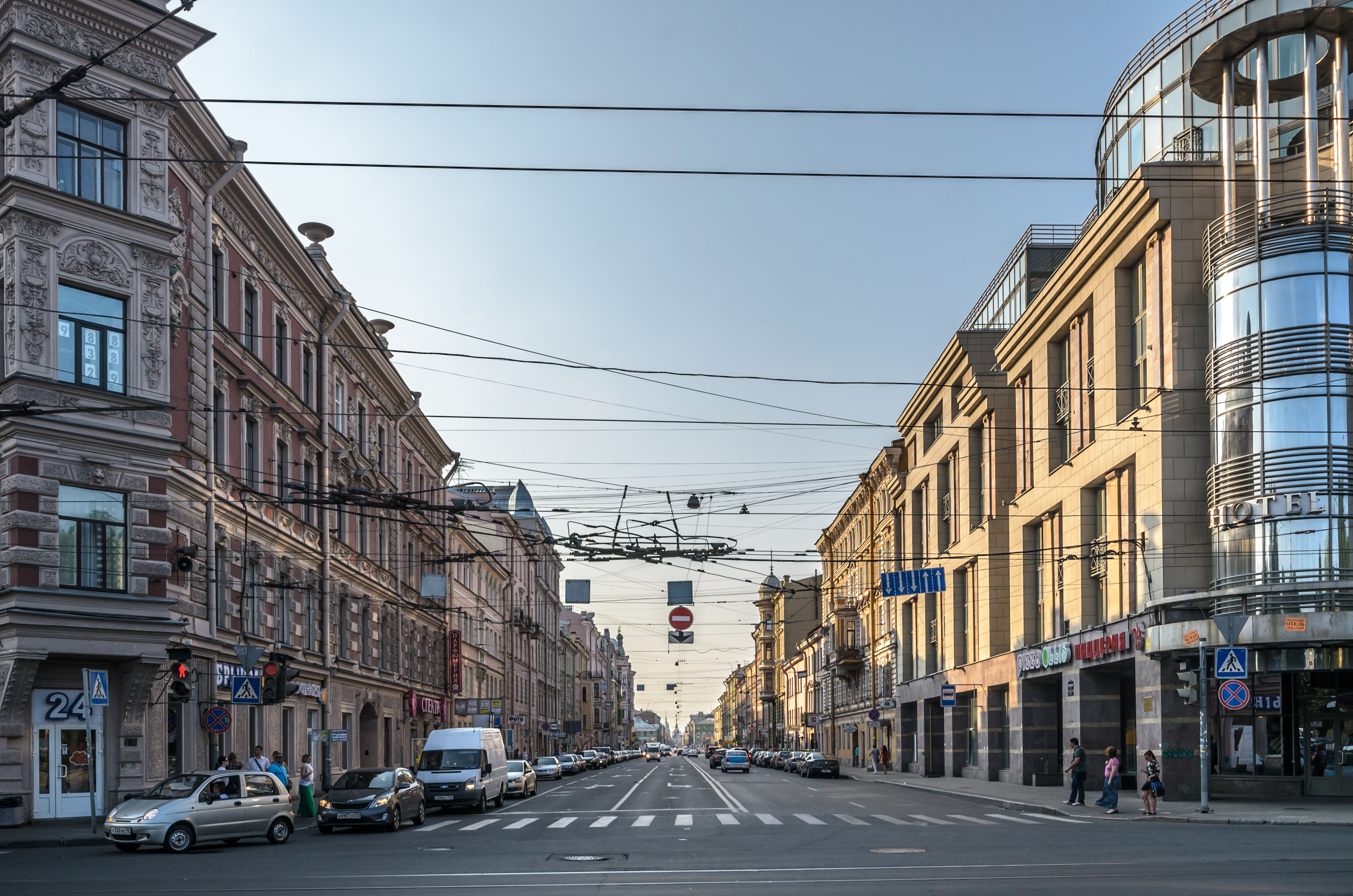
Gorokhovaya Street, looking toward the Admiralty

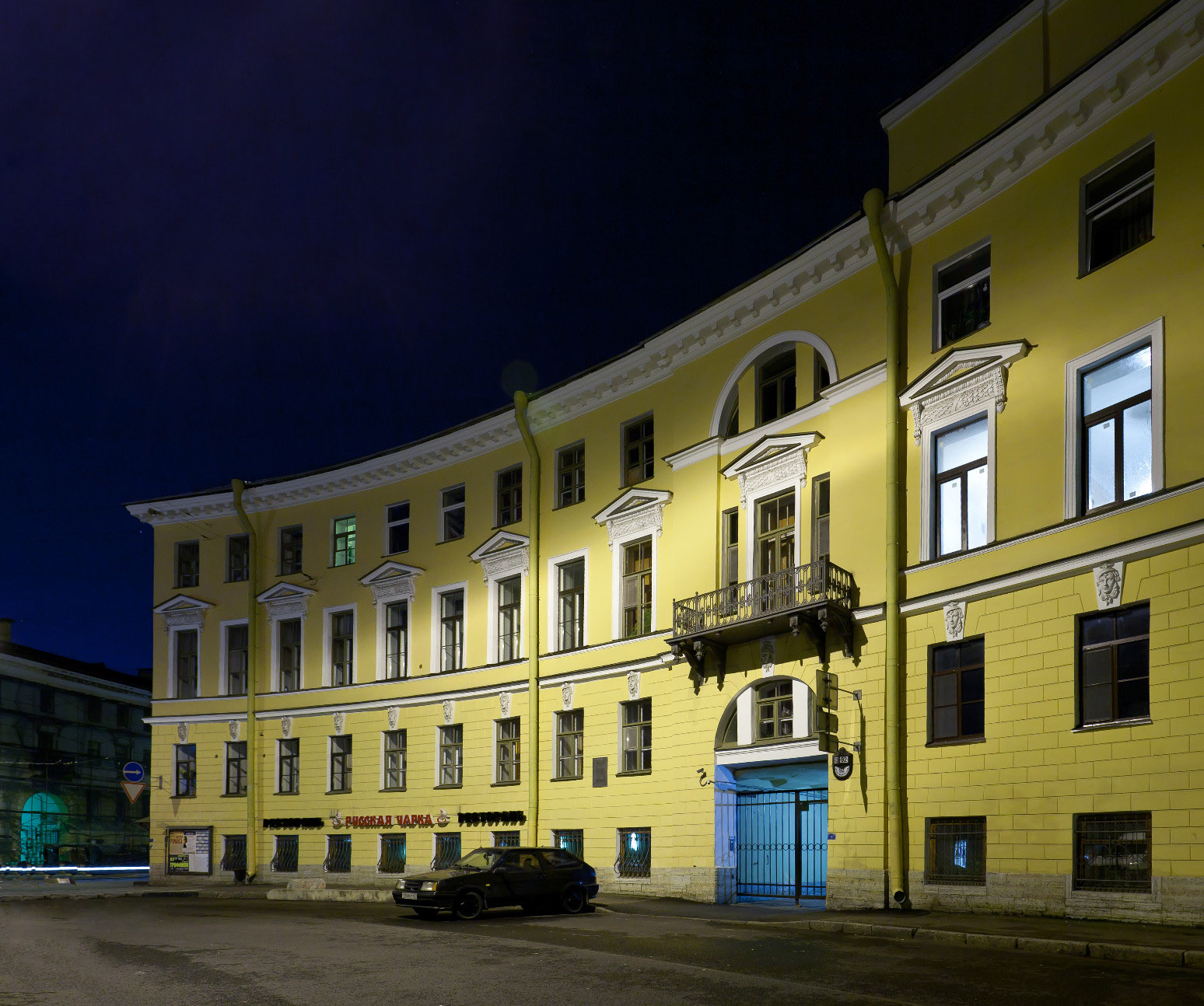
Neoclassical architecture in Gorokhovaya Street

Gorokhovaya Street (Russian: Гороховая улица, romanized: Gorkhovaya ulitsa) is a north-south thoroughfare in the Central Business District of Saint Petersburg.

Gorokhovaya Street is one of central Saint Petersburg's major thoroughfares, extending from the Admiralty and running south, crossing the Moyka River and the Griboyedov Canal, crossing Sadovaya Street near Sennaya Square. Continuing south, it crosses the Fontanka River with the Semenovsky Bridge, and ends at Zagorodny Prospect.

== History ==
The street was planned and laid after the catastrophic fires of 1736 and 1738 destroyed most of the buildings on Admiralteysky Island of Saint Petersburg. The original name Sredny Prospect (literally the Middle Prospect) outlined its connection to other two prospects converging on the Admiralty building, Saint Petersburg: Nevsky Prospect (known as Bolshoy, The Larger, Prospect) and Voznesensky Avenue (known as Maliy, The Lesser, Prospect).

In 1770, the street received its present name Gorokhovaya Street (literally Pea Street). According to a popular legend the name comes from a German merchant Harrach, whose name was russified as Gorokhov. Some historians find the legend unconvincing as no records indicate presence of a merchant named Harrach and merchants named Gorokhov were not associated with the street.

Between 1918 and 1927 the street was renamed Komissarskaya Street, then between 1927 and 1991 it was renamed Dzerzhinsky Street after Felix Dzerzhinsky. Both names were connected with the Cheka office headed by Felix Dzerzhinsky situated in house number 2 of the street.

In 1991, after the Perestroika the name Gorokhovaya was restored.

== Landmarks ==
Briantsev Youth Theatre, one of the first professional children's theatres in Russia, has been located on the street since 1922.

The nearest subway stations are Sennaya Ploshchad and Pushkinskaya.

The titular character of Ivan Goncharov's novel Oblomov lives on Gorokhovaya Street. It is featured in several other works of literature, including Gogol's "Diary of a Madman," Dostoyevsky's The Idiot, and Chernyshevsky's What Is to Be Done?.

Gorokhovaya Street was formerly named "Dzerzhinsky Street", after Felix Edmundovich Dzerzhinsky.

== External links and references ==
- Photographs of buildings on Gorokhovaya Street (in Russian)
- Gorokhovaya street on site Walkspb.ru
