= Narvsky Municipal Okrug =

Narvsky Municipal Okrug Нарвский муниципальный округ
- Municipal okrug
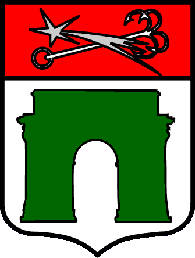
- Coat of arms

- Narvsky Municipal Okrug on the 2006 map of St. Petersburg
- Coordinates: 59°54′N 30°16′E
- Country: Russia
- Federal city: St. Petersburg

Population (2010 Census)
  - Total: 30,810
- Website: http://narvski-okrug.spb.ru

Narvsky Municipal Okrug (Russian: На́рвский муниципа́льный о́круг) is a municipal okrug in Kirovsky District, one of the eighty-one low-level municipal divisions of the federal city of St. Petersburg, Russia. As of the 2010 Census, its population was 30,810, up from 29,822 recorded during the 2002 Census.

It was formerly known as Municipal Okrug 29 (муниципальный округ №29).
