= Kirovsky District, Saint Petersburg =

Kirovsky District Кировский район
- District
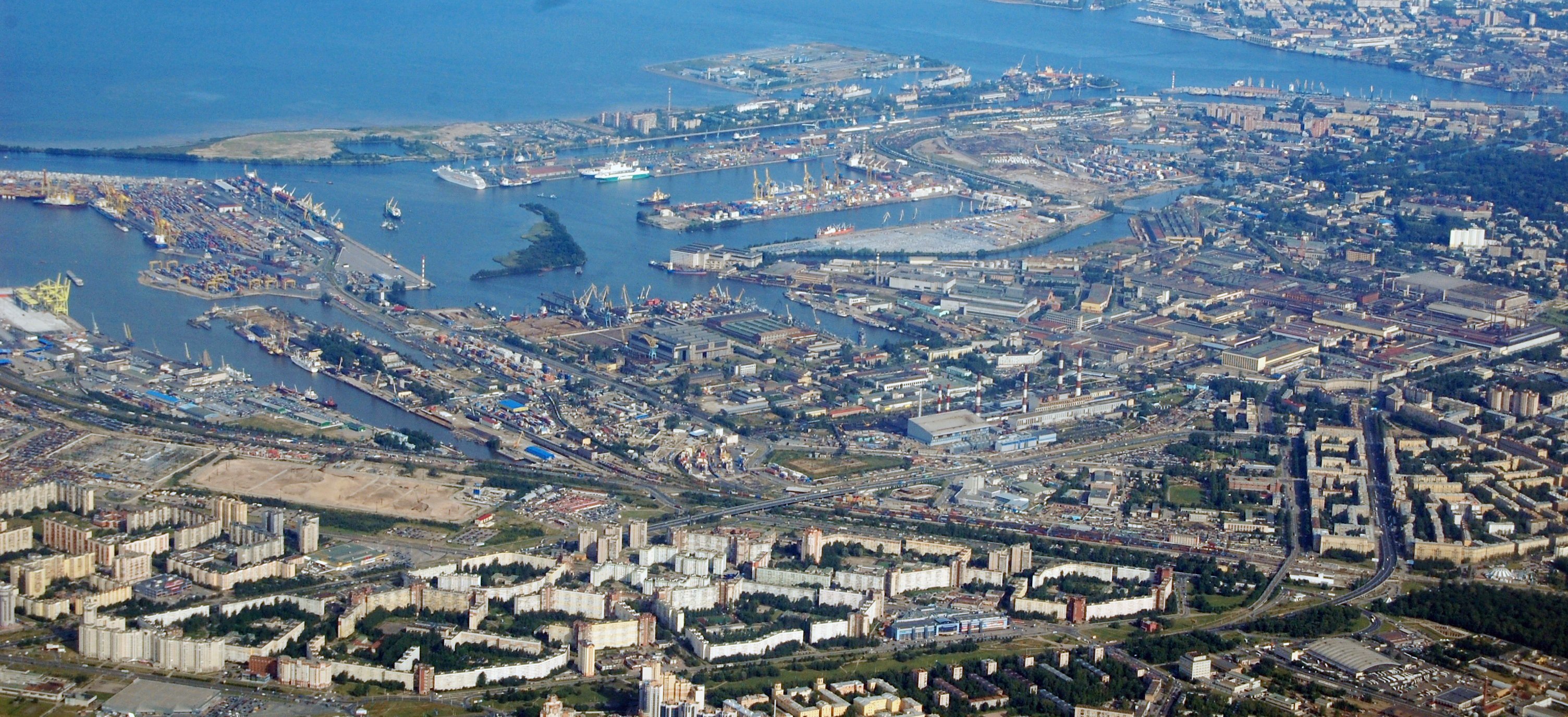
- Kirovsky District on the 2006 map of St. Petersburg
- Coordinates: 59°52′N 30°14′E
- Country: Russia
- Federal subject: federal city of St. Petersburg
- Established: 1917

Area
  - Total: 48 km^{2} (19 sq mi)

Population (2010 Census)
  - Total: 334,746
  - Density: 7,000/km^{2} (18,000/sq mi)
- Website: http://gov.spb.ru/gov/terr/reg_kirovsk/

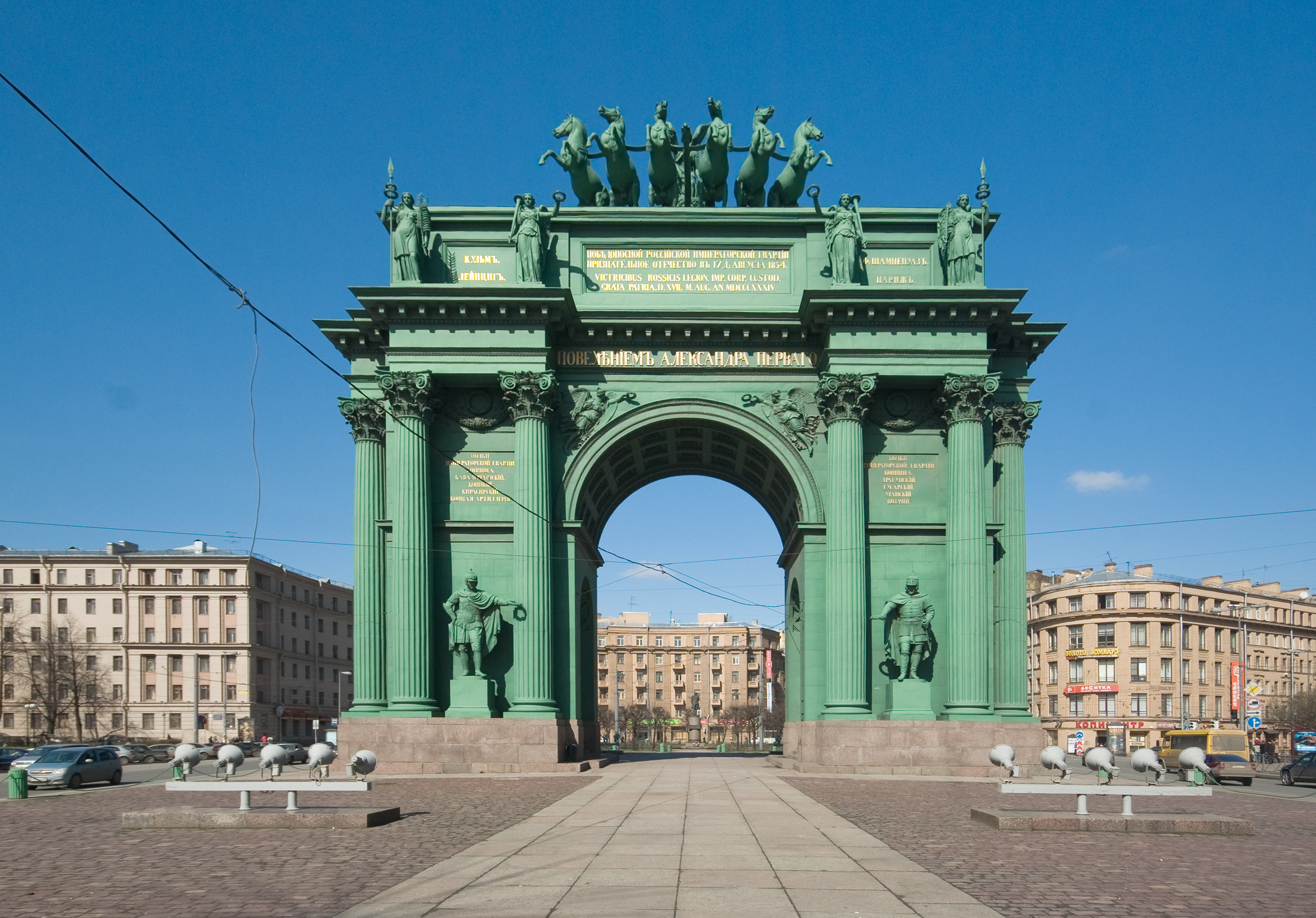
Narva Triumphal Arch

Kirovsky District (Russian: Ки́ровский райо́н) is a district of the federal city of St. Petersburg, Russia. As of the 2010 Census, its population was 334,746; down from 338,820 recorded in the 2002 Census.

== Municipal divisions ==
Kirovsky District comprises the following seven municipal okrugs:

- Avtovo
- Dachnoye
- Knyazhevo
- Krasnenkaya Rechka
- Morskiye Vorota
- Narvsky
- Ulyanka
