= Admiralteysky District =

Admiralteysky District Адмиралтейский район (Russian)
- District
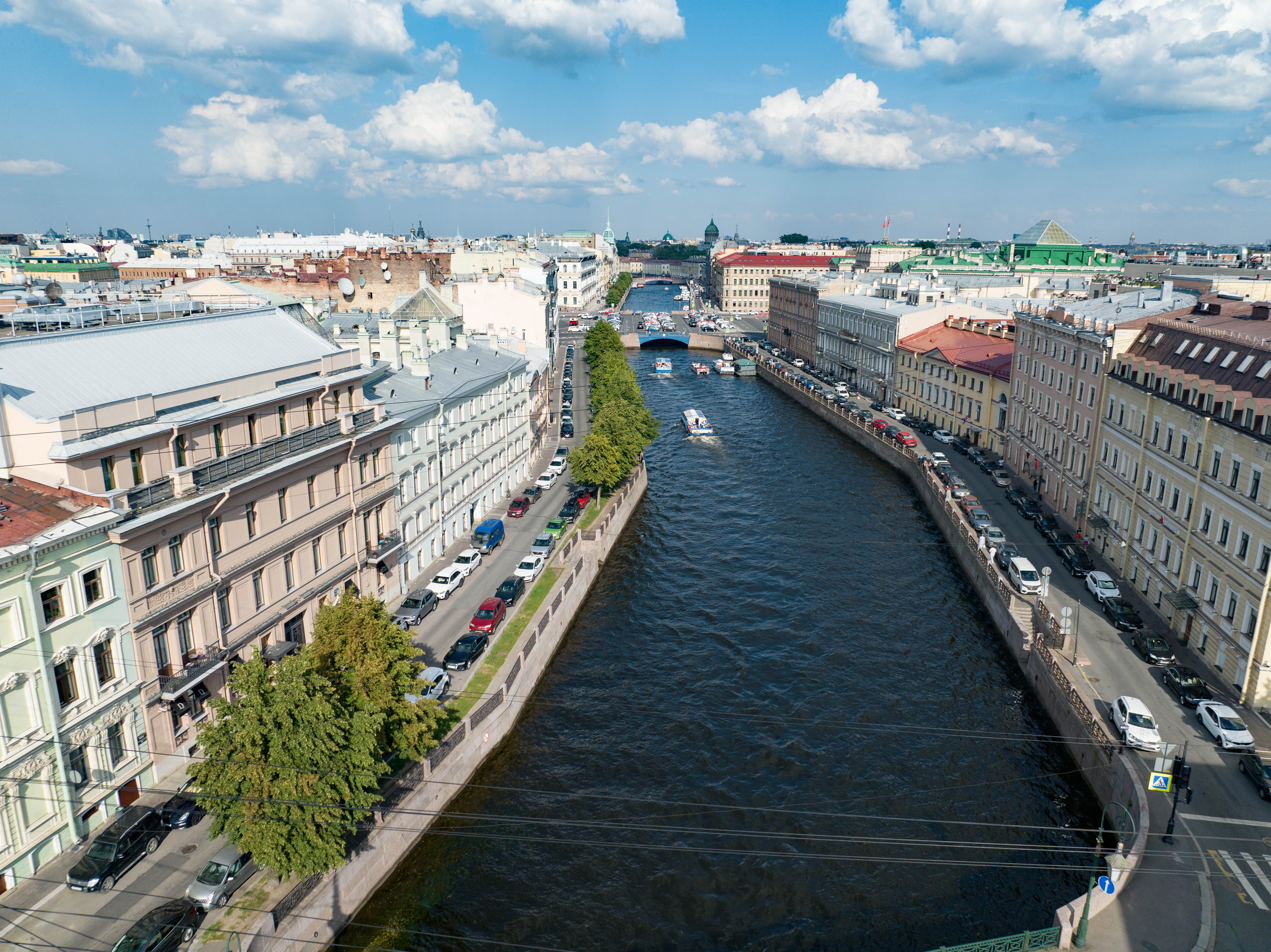

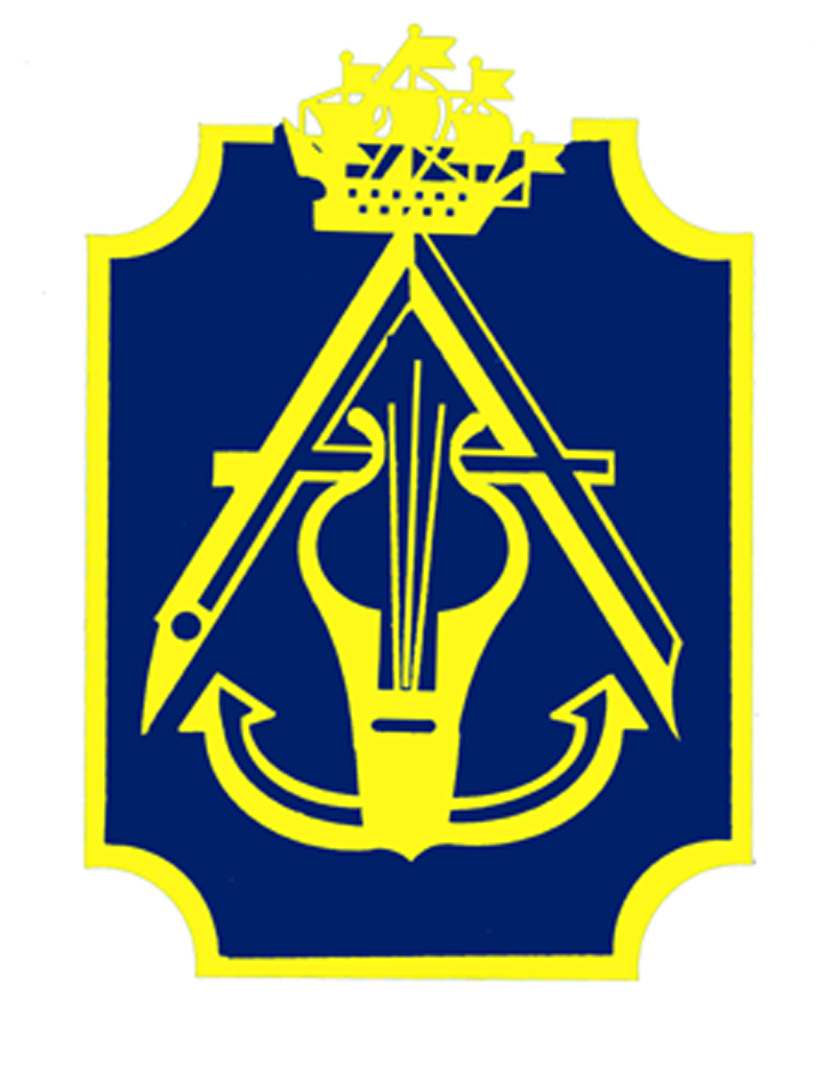
- Coat of arms
- Admiralteysky District on the 2006 map of St. Petersburg
- Coordinates: 59°55′N 30°18′E
- Country: Russia
- Federal subject: federal city of St. Petersburg
- Established: March 11, 1994

Area
  - Total: 13.82 km^{2} (5.34 sq mi)

Population (2010 Census)
  - Total: 157,897
  - Density: 11,430/km^{2} (29,590/sq mi)
- Website: http://gov.spb.ru/gov/terr/reg_admiral/

Admiralteysky District (Russian: Адмиралте́йский райо́н) is a district of the federal city of St. Petersburg, Russia. As of the 2010 Census, its population was 157,897; down from 187,837 recorded in the 2002 Census.

== Geography ==
The district borders the Neva River in the north and in the west, the Yekateringofka River in the southwest, areas around Gorokhovaya Street in the east, and areas around Zagorodny Avenue in the south.

== History ==
It was established on March 11, 1994 as a result of the merger of Leninsky and Oktyabrsky Districts.

== Municipal divisions ==
Admiralteysky District comprises the following six municipal okrugs:

- Admiralteysky
- Izmaylovskoye
- Kolomna
- Semyonovsky
- Sennoy
- Yekateringofsky
