= Fontanka =

Left branch of the river Neva in Saint Petersburg, Russia

Coordinates: 59°55′00″N 30°16′42″E

The Fontanka (Russian: Фонтанка), a left branch of the river Neva, flows through the whole of Central Saint Petersburg, Russia – from the Summer Garden to Gutuyevsky Island. It is 6.7 kilometres (4.2 mi) long, with a width up to 70 metres (230 ft), and a depth up to 3.5 metres (11 ft). The Moyka River forms a right-bank branch of the Fontanka. Lined along the Fontanka Embankment stand the former private residences of Russian nobility.

== Description ==
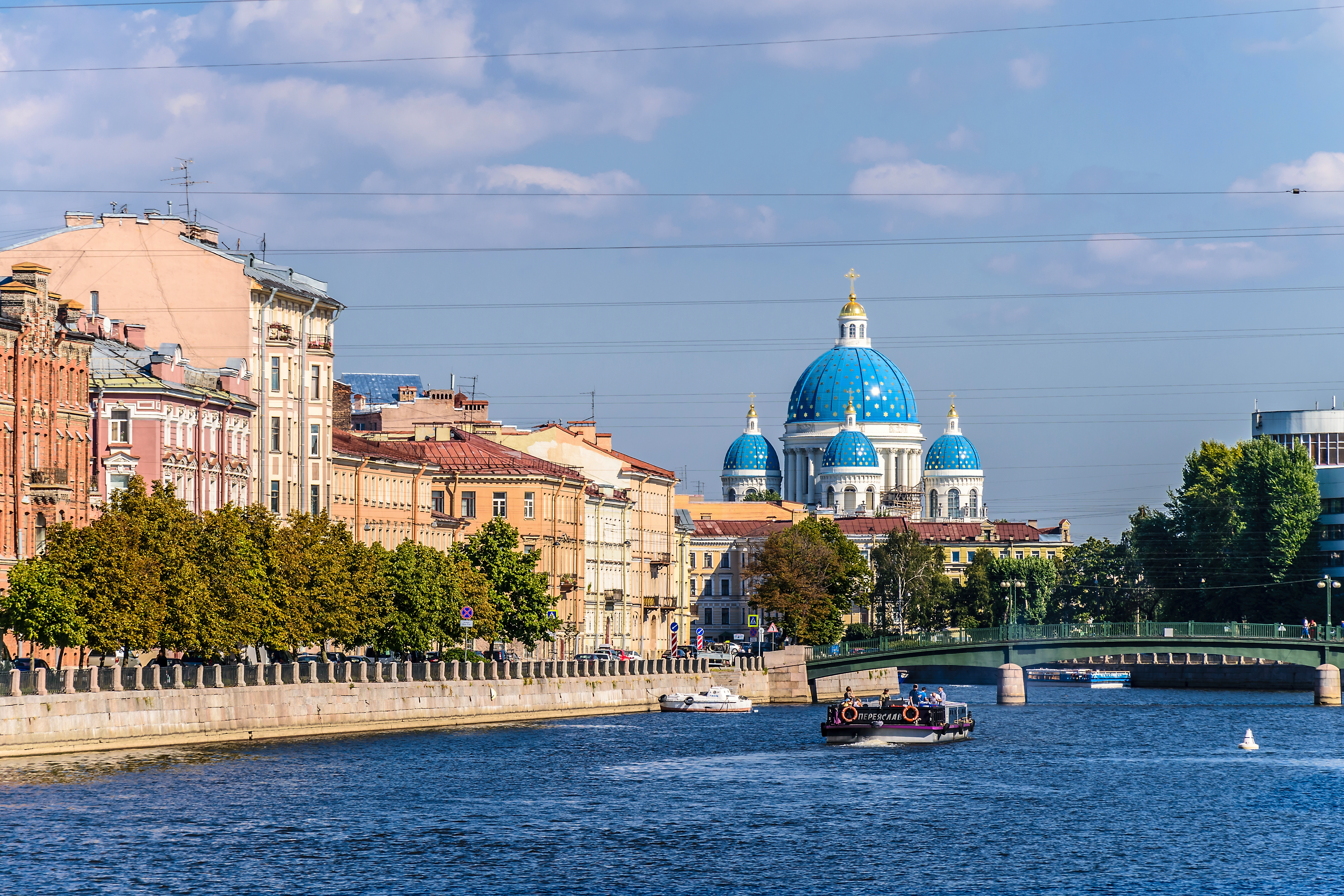
Fontanka River Perspective. View to Trinity Cathedral.

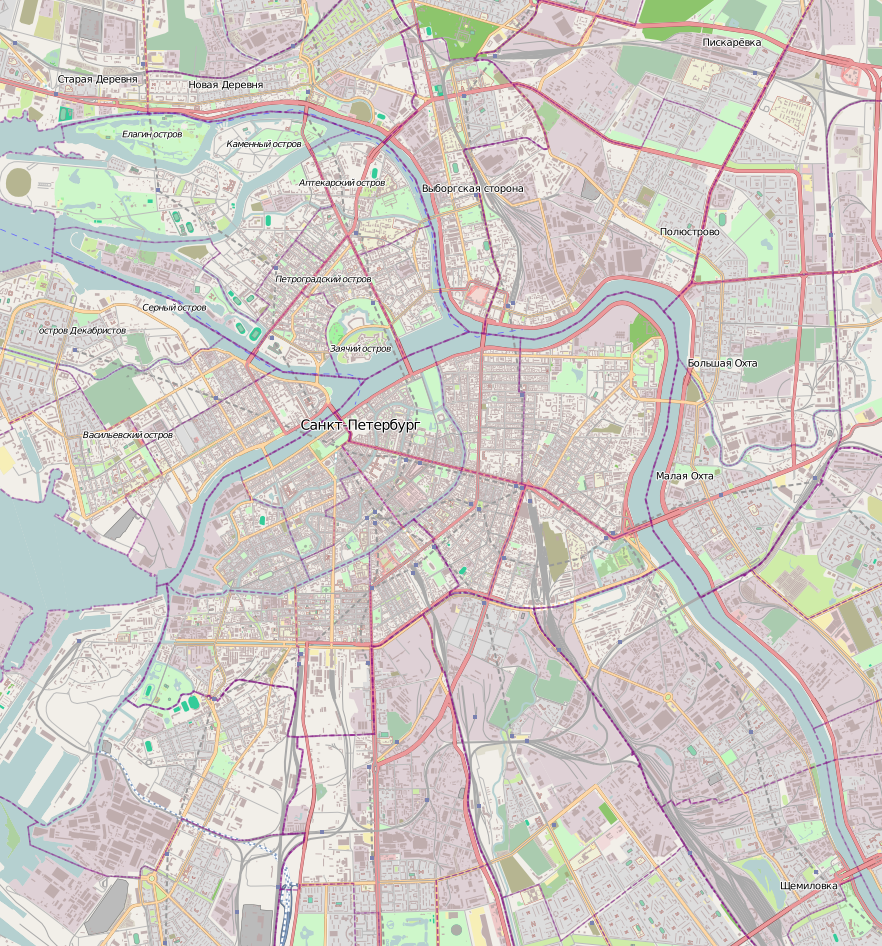
Fontanka course in central St Petersburg

The river, one of 93 rivers and channels in Saint Petersburg, was once named Anonymous Creek (in Russian, Bezymyannyi Yerik, Безымянный ерик). In Russian, yerik is a secondary or intermittent river-channel (creek or brook). In 1719 the river received its present name, because water from it supplied the fountains of the Summer Garden.

Until the mid-18th century the Fontanka River marked the southern boundary of Saint Petersburg. Along its banks stood the spacious messuages of members of the Russian Imperial Family and of the nobility, the most brilliant being the Summer Palace and the Anichkov Palace. In 1780–89, architect Andrey Kvasov supervised the construction of the granite embankments and approaches to the river. The river-bed was regularised as well.

Examples of Baroque architecture along the banks of the river include the Sheremetev Palace, Beloselsky-Belozersky Palace, Naryshkin-Shuvalov Palace, and the Church of St Panteleimon (built 1735–1739). Notable Neoclassical structures from the 18th century include the Catherine Institute, the Anichkov Palace and the Yusupov Palace on Sadovaya Street.

Some of the mansions contain museums of the writers and composers who lived there: Gavrila Derzhavin (1743–1816), Alexander Pushkin (1799–1837), Ivan Turgenev (1818–1833), Anna Akhmatova (1889–1966) and others.

Fifteen bridges span the Fontanka, including the 18th-century Lomonosov Bridge and the extravagant Egyptian Bridge. The most famous bridge, the Anichkov Bridge, carries the Nevsky Prospekt over the river.

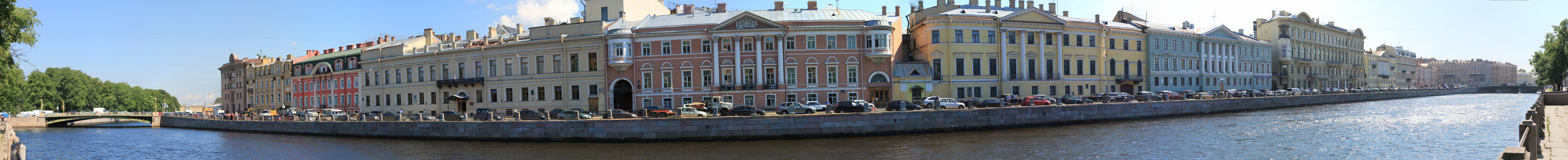
Panorama of Fontanka centred on St Panteleimon's Bridge and Summer Garden behind it

== See also ==
- List of bridges in Saint Petersburg
