= Southern constituency (Saint Petersburg) =

Legislative division of Saint Petersburg, Russia

Southern single-member constituency
- Constituency of the Russian State Duma
- Deputy: Vitaly Milonov; United Russia
- Federal subject: Saint Petersburg
- Districts: Admiralteysky District (Izmaylovskoye, Semyonovsky, Sennoy), Moskovsky, Pushkinsky
- Voters: 500,762 (2026)

The Southern constituency (No.218 (Note: No.211 in 1993-1995, No.213 in 1995-2007)) is a Russian legislative constituency in Saint Petersburg. The constituency stretches from central part of the city southwards to its inner suburbs, including Pushkin and Pavlovsk.

The constituency has been represented since 2016 by United Russia deputy Vitaly Milonov, former Member of Legislative Assembly of Saint Petersburg.

== Boundaries ==
1993–1995: Frunzensky District, Pavlovsk, Pushkinsky District
The constituency covered southern Saint Petersburg and its inner southern suburbs, including Pushkin and Pavlovsk.

1995–2003: Frunzensky District, Nevsky District (Municipal Okrug 49, Municipal Okrug 50, Obukhovsky, Rybatskoye)
Following the 1995 redistricting the constituency was significantly changed, losing Pushkin and Pavlovsk to South-Western constituency. This seat instead gained industrial and dense residential areas to the east in Nevsky District from the dissolved South-Eastern constituency.

2003–2007: Frunzensky District, Nevsky District (Municipal Okrug 49, Municipal Okrug 50, Obukhovsky, Rybatskoye, Municipal Okrug 53)
After the 2003 redistricting the constituency was slightly altered, gaining Municipal Okrug 53 in Nevsky District from Eastern constituency.

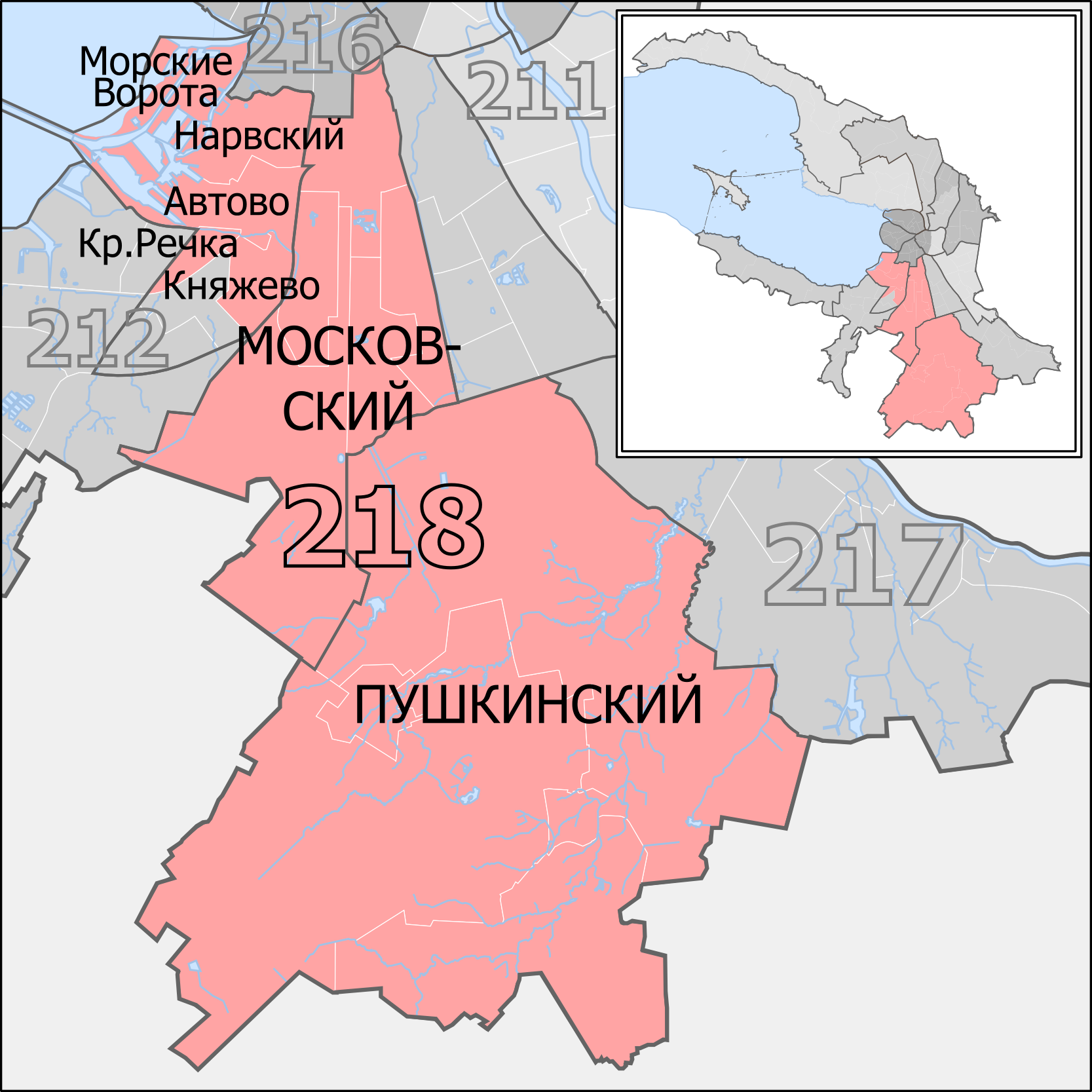
Constituency boundaries from 2016 to 2026

2016–2026: Kirovsky District (Avtovo, Knyazhevo, Krasnenkaya Rechka, Morskiye Vorota, Narvsky), Moskovsky District, Pushkinsky District
The constituency was re-created for the 2016 election but did not retain any of its former territory, losing Nevsky District to Eastern constituency and Frunzensky District – to South-Eastern constituency. This seat instead took most of the eliminated South-Western constituency and part of Kirovsky District from the dissolved Admiralteysky constituency.

2026–present: Admiralteysky District (Izmaylovskoye, Semyonovsky, Sennoy), Moskovsky District, Pushkinsky District
The constituency was changed following the 2025 redistricting, swapping its portion of Kirovsky District for eastern Admiralteysky District with Central constituency.

== Members elected ==
Election	Member	Party
1993	Aleksandr Yegorov	Independent
1995	Aleksandr Mazur	Yabloko
1999	Oksana Dmitriyeva	Fatherland – All Russia
2003	Oksana Dmitriyeva	Development of Enterprise
2007	Proportional representation - no election by constituency	
2011	Proportional representation - no election by constituency	
2016	Vitaly Milonov	United Russia
2021	Vitaly Milonov	United Russia
2026	Vitaly Milonov	United Russia

== Election results ==
=== 1993 ===
Summary of the 12 December 1993 Russian legislative election in the Southern constituency
Candidate	Party	Votes	%
Aleksandr Yegorov	Independent	36,107	16.06%
Yelena Drapeko	Independent	–	14.71%
Ivan Chibisov	Independent	–	–
Oleg Gapanovich	Civic Union	–	–
Yury Gladkov	Choice of Russia	–	–
Boris Gubanov	Yavlinky–Boldyrev–Lukin	–	–
Aleksey Levashyov	Independent	–	–
Lev Toper	Independent	–	–
Yury Zorin	Independent	–	–
Total		224,803	100%

=== 1995 ===
Summary of the 17 December 1995 Russian legislative election in the Southern constituency
Candidate	Party	Votes	%
Aleksandr Mazur	Yabloko	57,854	22.35%
Vladimir Tokarev	Communist Party	28,114	10.86%
Sergey Popov (incumbent) (Note: redistricted from South-Eastern constituency)	Independent	20,877	8.07%
Oleg Sergeyev	Party of Workers' Self-Government	16,236	6.27%
Aleksandr Yegorov (incumbent)	Ivan Rybkin Bloc	14,520	5.61%
Aleksey Borets	Independent	11,111	4.29%
Nikolay Kupriyanov	Pamfilova–Gurov–Lysenko	8,249	3.19%
Aleksey Musakov	Congress of Russian Communities	7,478	2.89%
Vladislav Karabanov	Independent	7,263	2.81%
Viktor Zavadsky	Independent	6,735	2.60%
Nikolay Shchepiorko	Communists and Working Russia - for the Soviet Union	6,544	2.53%
Ivan Sadchikov	Liberal Democratic Party	5,686	2.20%
Anatoly Mukhin	Trade Unions and Industrialists – Union of Labour	5,533	2.14%
Pavel Nazarov	Independent	5,510	2.13%
Nikolay Tikhonov	Independent	5,225	2.02%
Tatyana Vinogradova	Transformation of the Fatherland	4,047	1.56%
Mikhail Novikov	Federal Democratic Movement	3,987	1.54%
Vladimir Bogomolov	Independent	3,880	1.50%
Yevgeny Ivanov	Education — Future of Russia	3,029	1.17%
Pavel Kutenkov	Independent	2,485	0.96%
Ivan Kravchenko	Independent	2,363	0.91%
Yury Romanov	Russian Party of Automobile Owners	1,891	0.73%
Oleg Razygrin	Duma-96	372	0.14%
against all		25,331	9.79%
Total		258,809	100%

=== 1999 ===
Summary of the 19 December 1999 Russian legislative election in the Southern constituency
Candidate	Party	Votes	%
Oksana Dmitriyeva	Fatherland – All Russia	95,120	40.67%
German Azersky	Yabloko	27,033	11.56%
Vladimir Tokarev	Communist Party	26,664	11.40%
Aleksandr Yegorov	Congress of Russian Communities-Yury Boldyrev Movement	12,160	5.20%
Valentin Korovin	Party of Pensioners	8,107	3.47%
Sergey Ovsyannikov	Liberal Democratic Party	6,785	2.90%
Tamara Vedernikova	Communists and Workers of Russia - for the Soviet Union	6,299	2.69%
Georgy Fedorov	Russian Socialist Party	4,553	1.95%
Aleksandr Bespalov	Our Home – Russia	4,145	1.77%
Aleksandr Yevseyev	Independent	3,406	1.46%
Vladimir Bogomolov	Independent	2,917	1.25%
Pavel Kutenkov	Independent	2,587	1.11%
Vladislav Karabanov	Spiritual Heritage	2,113	0.90%
against all		29,538	12.63%
Total		233,908	100%

=== 2003 ===
Summary of the 7 December 2003 Russian legislative election in the Southern constituency
Candidate	Party	Votes	%
Oksana Dmitriyeva (incumbent)	Development of Enterprise	106,780	53.99%
Oleg Sergeyev	United Russia	28,411	14.36%
Natalia Yevdokimova	Yabloko	17,051	8.62%
Yevgeny Kosterev	Party of Russia's Rebirth-Russian Party of Life	10,087	5.10%
Andrey Yerofeyev	Liberal Democratic Party	6,746	3.41%
Andrey Anokhin	United Russian Party Rus'	5,431	2.75%
against all		20,787	10.51%
Total		197,997	100%

=== 2016 ===
Summary of the 18 September 2016 Russian legislative election in the Southern constituency
Candidate	Party	Votes	%
Vitaly Milonov	United Russia	56,068	34.24%
Aleksey Kovalyov	A Just Russia	22,845	13.95%
Dmitry Pavlov	Party of Growth	16,489	10.07%
Olga Tsepilova	Yabloko	16,382	10.00%
Ilya Rubtsov	Liberal Democratic Party	12,452	7.60%
German Sadulayev	Communist Party	12,075	7.37%
Yury Perevyazkin	Communists of Russia	5,960	3.64%
Anna Filonenko	Rodina	5,425	3.31%
Lev Dmitriyev	People's Freedom Party	4,463	2.73%
Aleksey Grave	Patriots of Russia	3,090	1.89%
Ruslan Tikhomirov	Civic Platform	2,281	1.39%
Total		163,766	100%

=== 2021 ===
Summary of the 17-19 September 2021 Russian legislative election in the Southern constituency
Candidate	Party	Votes	%
Vitaly Milonov (incumbent)	United Russia	48,671	26.66%
Boris Oreshkov	Yabloko	30,512	16.72%
Valery Duleba	Communist Party	27,651	15.15%
Yekaterina Mashkova	New People	18,167	9.95%
Ilya Shmakov	A Just Russia — For Truth	15,254	8.36%
Sergey Lisovsky	Party of Pensioners	9,461	5.18%
Yury Lomakin	Liberal Democratic Party	7,423	4.07%
Andrey Krutov	Party of Growth	5,607	3.07%
Alik Burlakov	The Greens	5,601	3.07%
Sergey Krupko	Rodina	3,480	1.91%
Maksim Tsymbalyuk	Green Alternative	1,433	0.79%
Aleksandr Smirnov	Civic Platform	1,379	0.76%
Total		182,535	100%

=== 2026 ===
Summary of the 18-20 September 2026 Russian legislative election in the Southern constituency
Candidate	Party	Votes	%
Vitaly Milonov (incumbent)	United Russia	142,246	55.21%
Yekaterina Suturina	New People	28,643	11.12%
Sergey Ivliyev	Communist Party	22,063	8.56%
Andrey Malkov	Liberal Democratic Party	21,915	8.51%
Dmitry Khorzov	Yabloko	16,501	6.40%
Sergey Litvyak	The Greens	13,475	5.23%
Grigory Kubatyan	A Just Russia	9,981	3.87%
Total		257,664	100%
