= South-Eastern constituency (Saint Petersburg) =

South-Eastern single-member constituency
- Constituency of the Russian State Duma
- Deputy: Lyubov Yegorova; United Russia
- Federal subject: Saint Petersburg
- Districts: Frunzensky, Kolpinsky, Tsentralny (Municipal Okrug 78, Dvortsovy, Ligovka-Yamskaya, Vladimirsky)
- Voters: 496,389 (2026)

The South-Eastern constituency (No.217 (Note: No.212 in 1993-1995)) is a Russian legislative constituency in Saint Petersburg. The constituency stretches from the central part of the city to its south-eastern suburbs in Kolpino.

The constituency has been represented since 2026 by United Russia deputy Lyubov Yegorova, former Member of Legislative Assembly of Saint Petersburg, 1992 and 1994 Olympic Champion cross-country skier and 2021 runner-up for this seat, who defeated seven-term New People incumbent Oksana Dmitriyeva in a rematch.

== Boundaries ==
1993–1995: Kolpinsky District, Nevsky District
The constituency covered residential and industrial areas in eastern Saint Petersburg as well as its inner suburbs, including Kolpino. Following the 1995 redistricting the constituency was dissolved and partitioned between Eastern, South-Western and Southern constituencies.

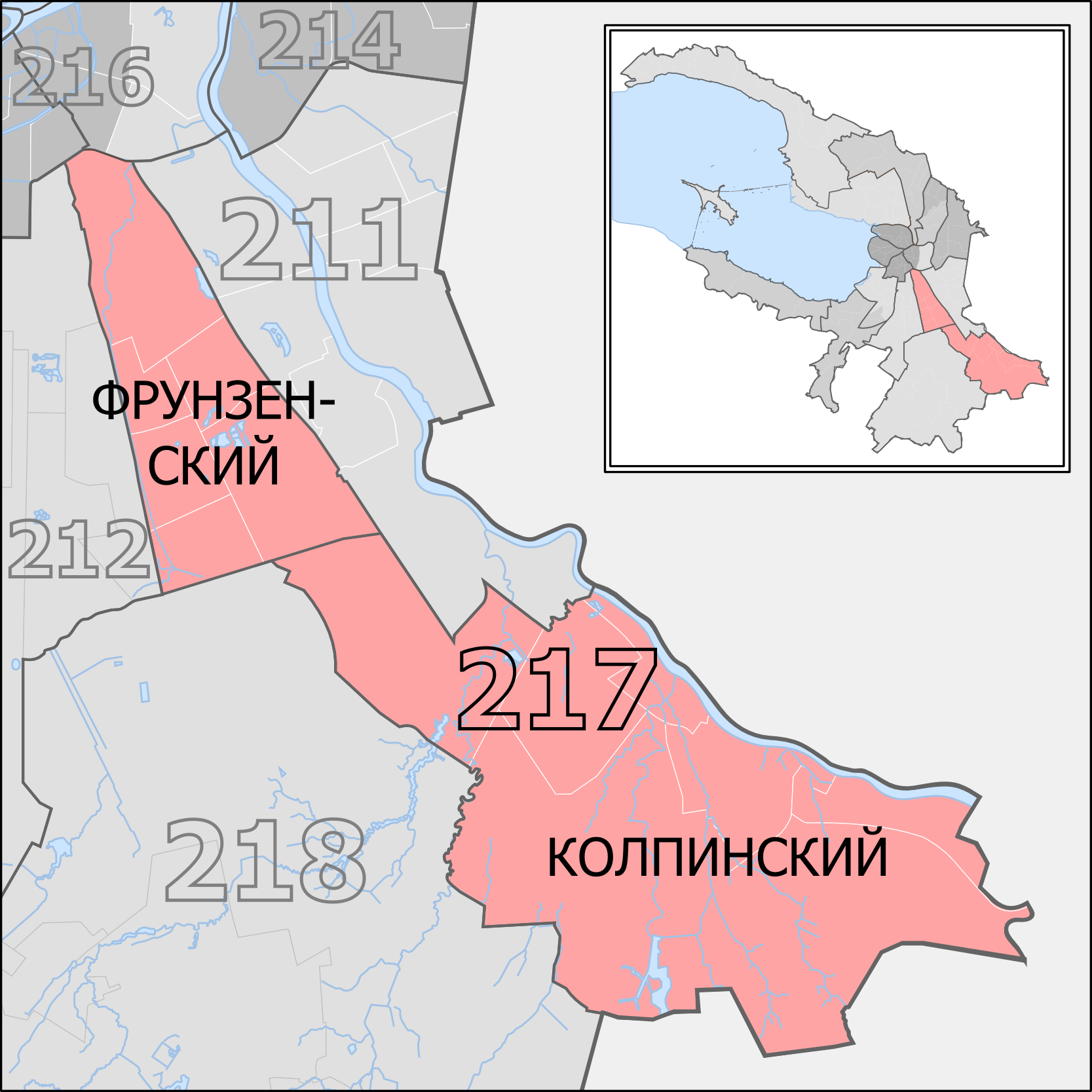
Constituency boundaries from 2016 to 2026

2016–2026: Frunzensky District, Kolpinsky District
The constituency was re-created for the 2016 election, taking all of Kolpinsky District from the dissolved South-Western constituency and Frunzensky District from the former Southern constituency.

2026–present: Frunzensky District, Kolpinsky District, Tsentralny District (Municipal Okrug 78, Dvortsovy, Ligovka-Yamskaya, Vladimirsky)
After the 2025 redistricting the constituency retained all of its former territory and gained most of Tsentralny District from Eastern and Central constituencies.

== Members elected ==
Election	Member	Party
1993	Sergey Popov	Choice of Russia
1995	Constituency eliminated	
1999	Constituency eliminated	
2003	Constituency eliminated	
2007	Proportional representation - no election by constituency	
2011	Proportional representation - no election by constituency	
2016	Mikhail Romanov	United Russia
2021	Oksana Dmitriyeva	Party of Growth
2026	Lyubov Yegorova	United Russia

== Election results ==
=== 1993 ===
Summary of the 12 December 1993 Russian legislative election in the South-Eastern constituency
Candidate	Party	Votes	%
Sergey Popov	Choice of Russia	42,648	17.48%
Yury Kuznetsov	Liberal Democratic Party	–	11.99%
Oleg Cherezov	Independent	–	–
Georgy Gukov	Independent	–	–
Nikolay Lutsenko	Independent	–	–
Vladimir Serdyukov	Independent	–	–
Andrey Yevdokimov	Democratic Party	–	–
Igor Yurkan	Independent	–	–
Valentin Zanin	Civic Union	–	–
Total		243,918	100%

=== 2016 ===
Summary of the 18 September 2016 Russian legislative election in the South-Eastern constituency
Candidate	Party	Votes	%
Mikhail Romanov	United Russia	40,834	30.31%
Oksana Dmitriyeva	Party of Growth	31,124	23.10%
Sergey Antipov	Liberal Democratic Party	14,740	10.94%
Svyatoslav Sokol	Communist Party	9,843	7.31%
Anatoly Aleksashin	A Just Russia	7,810	5.80%
Mikhail Gorny	Yabloko	6,454	4.79%
Oksana Dmitriyeva	Civilian Power	6,164	4.58%
Olga Perova	Communists of Russia	3,301	2.45%
Olesya Dmitriyeva	The Greens	2,867	2.13%
Maryana Yakovleva	Rodina	2,234	1.66%
Sergey Kuzin	People's Freedom Party	2,207	1.64%
Anatoly Artyukh	Patriots of Russia	1,298	0.96%
Tatyana Prokhorova	Civic Platform	1,216	0.90%
Total		134,710	100%

=== 2021 ===
Summary of the 17-19 September 2021 Russian legislative election in the South-Eastern constituency
Candidate	Party	Votes	%
Oksana Dmitriyeva	Party of Growth	48,180	33.28%
Lyubov Yegorova	United Russia	30,955	21.38%
Vyacheslav Sokolov	Communist Party	10,316	7.12%
Igor Averkin	Communists of Russia	10,103	6.98%
Ruslan Gaysin	A Just Russia — For Truth	8,200	5.66%
Igor Shumilin	New People	7,132	4.93%
Andrey Nezabudkin	Liberal Democratic Party	6,248	4.32%
Aleksey Shcherbakov	Party of Pensioners	5,935	4.10%
Grigory Mikhnov-Vaytenko	Yabloko	4,025	2.78%
Yelena Gromova	Green Alternative	3,152	2.18%
Andrey Petrov	Rodina	2,364	1.63%
Dmitry Rumyantsev	Civic Platform	1,398	0.97%
Total		144,792	100%

=== 2026 ===
Summary of the 18-20 September 2026 Russian legislative election in the South-Eastern constituency
Candidate	Party	Votes	%
Lyubov Yegorova	United Russia	124,616	49.31%
Oksana Dmitriyeva (incumbent)	New People	49,464	19.57%
Kirill Prokopenko	Liberal Democratic Party	18,985	7.51%
Yegor Mikhaylov	Communist Party	17,701	7.00%
Vitaly Isakov	Yabloko	14,796	5.85%
Marina Lebedeva	A Just Russia	8,928	3.53%
Veronika Klinovitskaya	Communists of Russia	7,383	2.92%
Igor Sergeyev	The Greens	5,838	2.31%
Total		252,726	100%
