= Eastern constituency (Saint Petersburg) =

Russian legislative constituency in Saint Petersburg

Eastern single-member constituency
- Constituency of the Russian State Duma
- Deputy: Mikhail Rakhlin; United Russia
- Federal subject: Saint Petersburg
- Districts: Krasnogvardeysky (Malaya Okhta, Porokhovye), Nevsky
- Voters: 525,985 (2026)

The Eastern constituency (No.211 (Note: No.207 in 1995-2007)) is a Russian legislative constituency in Saint Petersburg. The constituency covers all of Nevsky District and southern portion of Krasnogvardeysky District in eastern Saint Petersburg.

The constituency has been represented since 2026 by United Russia deputy Mikhail Rakhlin, son of judo coach Anatoly Rakhlin and judo coach himself, who won the open seat after defeating two-term United Russia incumbent Mikhail Romanov in the primary.

== Boundaries ==
1995–2003: Krasnogvardeysky District, Nevsky District (Municipal Okrug 53, Municipal Okrug 54, Nevsky, Okkervil, Municipal Okrug 57)
The constituency was created following the 1995 redistricting, taking all of industrial Krasnogvardeysky District from the eliminated North-Eastern constituency and northern part of Nevsky District from the eliminated South-Eastern constituency.

2003–2007: Krasnogvardeysky District, Nevsky District (Municipal Okrug 54, Nevsky, Okkervil, Municipal Okrug 57)
After the 2003 redistricting the constituency was slightly altered, losing Municipal Okrug 53 to Southern constituency.

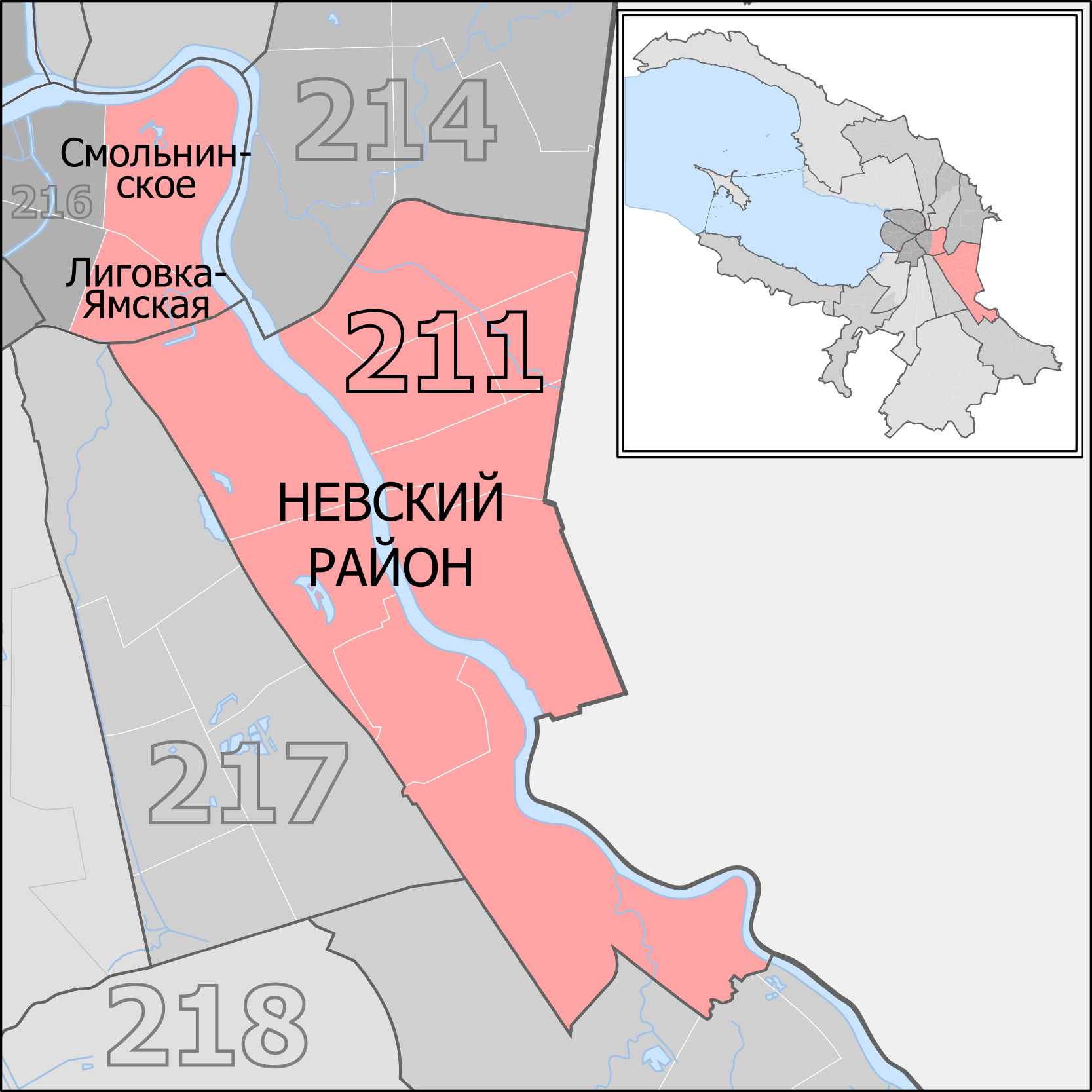
Constituency boundaries from 2016 to 2026

2016–2026: Nevsky District, Tsentralny District (Ligovka-Yamskaya, Smolninskoye)
The constituency was re-created for the 2016 election and retained only its Nevsky District portion, losing Krasnogvardeysky District to North-Eastern constituency. This seat instead gained the rest of Nevsky District from Southern constituency and eastern part of Tsentralny District from Central constituency.

2026–present: Krasnogvardeysky District (Malaya Okhta, Porokhovye), Nevsky District
Following the 2025 redistricting the constituency was slightly changed, losing its portion of Tsentralny District to Northern constituency (Smolninskoye) and South-Eastern constituency (Ligovka-Yamskaya). This seat instead gained parts of southern Krasnogvardeysky District from North-Eastern constituency.

== Members elected ==
Election	Member	Party
1995	Yury Nesterov	Yabloko
1999	Irina Khakamada	Union of Right Forces
2003	A by-election was scheduled after Against all line received the most votes	
2004	Aleksandr Morozov	Independent
2007	Proportional representation - no election by constituency	
2011	Proportional representation - no election by constituency	
2016	Igor Divinsky	United Russia
2021	Mikhail Romanov	United Russia
2026	Mikhail Rakhlin	United Russia

== Election results ==
=== 1995 ===
Summary of the 17 December 1995 Russian legislative election in the Eastern constituency
Candidate	Party	Votes	%
Yury Nesterov	Yabloko	52,043	17.27%
Konstantin Serov	Independent	25,753	8.55%
Pyotr Glushchenko	Communist Party	23,969	7.96%
Vladimir Serdyukov	Stanislav Govorukhin Bloc	23,904	7.93%
Dmitry Rozhdestvensky	Independent	19,244	6.39%
Yury Belyayev	Independent	15,879	5.27%
Sergey Vakulov	Communists and Working Russia - for the Soviet Union	13,421	4.45%
Sergey Vymenets	Independent	13,009	4.32%
Vladimir Luchkevich	Independent	12,103	4.02%
Mikhail Pirogov	Congress of Russian Communities	11,798	3.92%
Valery Andreyev	Forward, Russia!	8,260	2.74%
Anatoly Pshenichnikov	Party of Workers' Self-Government	7,415	2.46%
Mikhail Ivanov	Liberal Democratic Party	6,873	2.28%
Aleksandr Trafimov	Agrarian Party	5,272	1.75%
Aleksey Chernetsov	Independent	4,586	1.52%
Nikolay Golubev	Independent	3,935	1.31%
Vitaly Rystov	Independent	3,464	1.15%
Shukhrat Sayfullayev	Independent	2,829	0.94%
Aleksey Motorin	Independent	2,345	0.78%
Aleksey Zelenkov	Independent	2,071	0.69%
against all		34,928	11.59%
Total		301,302	100%

=== 1999 ===
Summary of the 19 December 1999 Russian legislative election in the Eastern constituency
Candidate	Party	Votes	%
Irina Khakamada	Union of Right Forces	64,132	23.49%
Aleksandr Morozov	Party of Pensioners	46,109	16.89%
Stepan Shabanov	Communist Party	33,073	12.11%
Yury Nesterov (incumbent)	Yabloko	25,692	9.41%
Vladimir Serdyukov	Independent	17,041	6.24%
Igor Vysotsky	Independent	10,338	3.79%
Yevgeny Kozlov	Independent	7,843	2.87%
Lyudmila Smirnova	Liberal Democratic Party	7,596	2.78%
Sergey Kovalev	Russian Socialist Party	5,713	2.09%
Valentin Kovalevsky	Independent	4,909	1.80%
Ilya Konstantinov	Spiritual Heritage	2,604	0.95%
Oleg Yerokhov	Independent	1,325	0.49%
against all		42,826	15.69%
Total		273,000	100%

=== 2003 ===
A by-election was scheduled after Against all line received the most votes.

Summary of the 7 December 2003 Russian legislative election in the Eastern constituency
Candidate	Party	Votes	%
Irina Rodnina	United Russia	42,568	21.84%
Grigory Tomchin	Union of Right Forces	32,946	16.90%
Yury Gatchin	Communist Party	16,945	8.69%
Andrey Ananov	Independent	16,077	8.25%
Valentin Nikolsky	Independent	13,985	7.17%
Aleksandr Koltsov	Liberal Democratic Party	7,615	3.95%
Nadezhda Shumeyko	Great Russia – Eurasian Union	6,123	3.14%
Nikolay Bondarik	Independent	4,391	2.25%
Aleksandr Yegorov	People's Party	4,010	2.06%
against all		46,646	23.93%
Total		195,176	100%

=== 2004 ===
Summary of the 14 March 2004 by-election in the Eastern constituency
Candidate	Party	Votes	%
Aleksandr Morozov	Independent	58,380	23.56%
Anna Markova	Independent	45,244	18.26%
Sergey Andreyev	Independent	36,297	14.65%
Grigory Tomchin	Independent	27,039	10.91%
Yury Gatchin	Communist Party	6,001	2.42%
Inna Safronova	Independent	4,532	1.82%
Andrey Yelchaninov	Independent	3,756	1.51%
Gennady Turetsky	Russian Communist Workers Party-Russian Party of Communists	3,537	1.42%
Sergey Tikhomirov	Liberal Democratic Party	3,485	1.40%
Oleg Prosypkin	Rodina	2,926	1.18%
Elvira Sharova	Independent	1,525	0.61%
against all		50,584	20.41%
Total		247,724	100%

=== 2016 ===
Summary of the 18 September 2016 Russian legislative election in the Eastern constituency
Candidate	Party	Votes	%
Igor Divinsky	United Russia	47,703	35.67%
Vladislav Bakulin	Party of Growth	15,274	11.42%
Viktor Lozhechko	A Just Russia	11,931	8.92%
Mikhail Stupakov	Yabloko	11,921	8.91%
Sergey Kozhanchi	Liberal Democratic Party	11,639	8.70%
Olga Khodunova	Communist Party	11,210	8.38%
Irina Melnikova	People's Freedom Party	7,112	5.32%
Yury Savin	Communists of Russia	4,900	3.66%
Andrey Ivanov	Rodina	4,752	3.55%
Konstantin Lavrinyuk	Patriots of Russia	1,380	1.03%
Mikhail Koifman	Civic Platform	964	0.72%
Total		133,736	100%

=== 2021 ===
Summary of the 17-19 September 2021 Russian legislative election in the Eastern constituency
Candidate	Party	Votes	%
Mikhail Romanov	United Russia	63,856	37.61%
Olga Khodunova	Communist Party	31,637	18.63%
Viktor Lozhechko	A Just Russia — For Truth	16,746	9.86%
Ksenia Goryacheva	New People	11,063	6.52%
Vladislav Bakulin	Party of Growth	10,727	6.32%
Maksim Gogolin	Party of Pensioners	6,981	4.11%
Maksim Stetsura	Liberal Democratic Party	6,279	3.70%
Nikita Sorokin	Yabloko	6,128	3.61%
Asya Borzova	The Greens	4,841	2.85%
Nina Abrosova	Rodina	3,203	1.89%
Ilona Khanina	Civic Platform	1,323	0.78%
Total		169,795	100%

=== 2026 ===
Summary of the 18-20 September 2026 Russian legislative election in the Eastern constituency
Candidate	Party	Votes	%
Mikhail Rakhlin	United Russia	162,582	55.97%
Svetlana Zhitkova	Liberal Democratic Party	33,756	11.62%
Maksim Milyayev	New People	28,232	9.72%
Yevgeny Sazontsev	Communist Party	24,628	8.48%
Nadezhda Ploshkina	The Greens	17,177	5.91%
Viktor Lozhechko	A Just Russia	12,029	4.14%
Anastasia Kizyukova	Yabloko	8,390	2.89%
Total		290,456	100%
