= South-Western constituency (Saint Petersburg) =

Russian legislative constituency

South-Western single-member constituency
- Constituency of the Russian State Duma

- Constituency boundaries from 1995 to 2007
- Deputy: None
- Federal subject: Saint Petersburg
- Districts: Kolpinsky, Moskovsky, Pavlovsk, Pushkinsky
- Voters: 456,134 (2003)

The South-Western constituency (No.212) was a Russian legislative constituency in Saint Petersburg in 1993–2007. It covered southern Saint Petersburg, as well as the cities of Kolpino and Pavlovsk. The seat was last occupied by Yabloko deputy Sergey Popov, an attorney, who narrowly defeated first-term incumbent State Duma member Mark Goryachev in the 1995 election.

The constituency was dissolved in 2007 when State Duma adopted full proportional representation for the next two electoral cycles. South-Western constituency was not re-established for the 2016 election, currently most of the former constituency is part of Southern constituency.

== Boundaries ==
1993–1995: northern part of Kirovsky District, Leninsky District, Moskovsky District
The constituency covered territories to the south-west of the city downtown, including some parts of central Saint Petersburg.

1995–2007: Kolpinsky District, Moskovsky District, Pavlovsk, Pushkinsky District
After 1995 redistricting the constituency was significantly altered, retaining only Moskovsky District and losing its parts of Kirovsky and Leninsky (now Admiralteysky) city districts to new Admiralteysky constituency. South-Western constituency was pushed to the southern outskirts of Saint Petersburg, gaining most of former Southern constituency (Pavlovsk and Pushkinsky District) and Kolpinsky District from South-Eastern constituency

== Members elected ==
Election	Member	Party
1993	Mark Goryachev	Civic Union
1995	Sergey Popov	Yabloko
1999	Sergey Popov	Yabloko
2003	Sergey Popov	Yabloko

== Election results ==
=== 1993 ===
==== Declared candidates ====
- Andrey Andreyev (Independent), Head of the Pension Fund regional office (1991–present)
- Sergey Andreyev (Independent), community activist
- Garigin Arutyunov (RDDR), nonprofit executive
- Mark Goryachev (Civic Union), billionaire businessman
- Dmitry Koltsov (Independent), privatization fund manager
- Yevgeny Krasnitsky (CPRF), former Member of Saint Petersburg City Council of People's Deputies (1990–1993)
- Boris Pustyntsev (Choice of Russia), dubbing producer, human rights activist
- Galina Spitsa (DPR), former Member of Saint Petersburg City Council of People's Deputies (1990–1993)
- Aleksandr Vinnikov (YaBL), former Member of Saint Petersburg City Council of People's Deputies (1990–1993)
- Aleksey Volotskoy (Independent), businessman

==== Results ====
Summary of the 12 December 1993 Russian legislative election in the South-Western constituency
Candidate	Party	Votes	%
Mark Goryachev	Civic Union	45,216	18.44%
Sergey Andreyev	Independent	–	14.68%
Andrey Andreyev	Independent	–	–
Garigin Arutyunov	Russian Democratic Reform Movement	–	–
Dmitry Koltsov	Independent	–	–
Yevgeny Krasnitsky	Communist Party	–	–
Boris Pustyntsev	Choice of Russia	–	–
Galina Spitsa	Democratic Party	–	–
Aleksandr Vinnikov	Yavlinsky–Boldyrev–Lukin	–	–
Aleksey Volotskoy	Independent	–	–
Total		245,269	100%

=== 1995 ===
==== Declared candidates ====
- Valery Anokhin (LDPR), aide to State Duma member
- Boris Blotner (Independent), construction materials businessman
- Valery Bunkin (BSG), deputy director of the FOMS regional office
- Yelena Drapeko (Independent), former Chairwoman of the Saint Petersburg Committee on Culture (1992–1993)
- Mark Goryachev (Independent), incumbent Member of State Duma (1994–present)
- Pyotr Filippov (Bloc '89), former People's Deputy of Russia (1990–1993)
- Vasily Ivanov (Union of Patriots), nonprofit director
- Vladimir Kopeykin (Revival), businessman
- Aleksandr Manayev (Independent), sports executive
- Aleksey Pozdyshev (BIR), state parking executive
- Sergey Popov (Yabloko), former Member of Saint Petersburg City Council of People's Deputies (1990–1993), attorney
- Aleksandr Potapov (Independent), pensioner
- Viktor Pravdyuk (Independent), TV executive, film producer
- Vladimir Shkrabak (APR), rector of the Saint Petersburg State Agrarian University (1994–present)
- Vatanyar Yagya (Independent), Member of Legislative Assembly of Saint Petersburg (1994–present)

==== Results ====
Summary of the 17 December 1995 Russian legislative election in the South-Western constituency
Candidate	Party	Votes	%
Sergey Popov	Yabloko	59,248	20.28%
Mark Goryachev (incumbent)	Independent	41,049	14.05%
Vatanyar Yagya	Independent	24,161	8.27%
Pyotr Filippov	Bloc '89	24,014	8.22%
Yelena Drapeko	Independent	22,066	7.55%
Vasily Ivanov	Union of Patriots	18,448	6.31%
Valery Anokhin	Liberal Democratic Party	9,916	3.39%
Vladimir Shkrabak	Agrarian Party	9,820	3.36%
Boris Blotner	Independent	9,224	3.16%
Valery Bunkin	Stanislav Govorukhin Bloc	9,172	3.14%
Viktor Pravdyuk	Independent	8,604	2.94%
Aleksandr Potapov	Independent	6,492	2.22%
Aleksey Pozdyshev	Ivan Rybkin Bloc	2,851	0.98%
Vladimir Kopeykin	Revival	2,800	0.96%
Aleksandr Manayev	Independent	2,622	0.90%
against all		33,084	11.32%
Total		292,174	100%

=== 1999 ===
==== Declared candidates ====
- Mikhail Ayvazov (Independent), Izhorskiye Zavody executive
- Yury Boldyrev (KRO-Boldyrev), Deputy Chairman of the Accounts Chamber of Russia (1995–present), former Member of Federation Council (1994–1996)
- Aleksandr Grigoryev (Independent), hockey coach
- Vladimir Kalashov (Independent), businessman
- Boris Kiselev (OVR), Member of Legislative Assembly of Saint Petersburg (1998–present)
- Vadim Kozlov (Independent), physician
- Ivan Kravchenko (RSP), Ministry for Tax and Revenue official
- Nikolay Kuznetsov (LDPR), housing utilities executive
- Sergey Popov (Yabloko), incumbent Member of State Duma (1996–present)
- Gennady Ravdis (Independent), sambo coach
- Yury Terentyev (K–TR–zSS), aide to State Duma member
- Vladislav Vinogradov (DN), Federal Antimonopoly Service official
- Mikhail Zlydnikov (NDR), businessman

==== Withdrawn candidates ====
- Andrey Vereshchagin (Independent), businessman
- Mikhail Yakovlev (RPP)

==== Did not file ====
- Garigin Arutyunov (Independent), nonprofit executive, 1993 candidate for this seat
- Oleg Dateyev (Independent)
- Sergey Lisovsky (Independent), journalist, ecological activist
- Dmitry Glavny (Independent)
- Yury Petrov (Independent)
- Aleksandr Seryakov (SPS), physicist
- Yury Timofeyev (Independent)
- Valery Vlasov (Independent), youth sports school director

==== Results ====
Summary of the 19 December 1999 Russian legislative election in the South-Western constituency
Candidate	Party	Votes	%
Sergey Popov (incumbent)	Yabloko	62,690	24.82%
Yury Boldyrev	Congress of Russian Communities-Yury Boldyrev Movement	51,761	20.49%
Boris Kiselev	Fatherland – All Russia	33,110	13.11%
Yury Terentyev	Communists and Workers of Russia - for the Soviet Union	24,977	9.89%
Mikhail Ayvazov	Independent	11,654	4.61%
Gennady Ravdis	Independent	6,665	2.64%
Nikolay Kuznetsov	Liberal Democratic Party	5,129	2.03%
Vadim Kuznetsov	Independent	4,796	1.90%
Mikhail Zlydnikov	Our Home – Russia	3,460	1.37%
Aleksandr Grigoryev	Independent	3,329	1.32%
Vladimir Kalashov	Independent	2,285	0.90%
Vladislav Vinogradov	Spiritual Heritage	1,984	0.79%
Ivan Kravchenko	Russian Socialist Party	1,653	0.65%
Andrey Levitsky	Independent	1,401	0.55%
against all		34,758	13.76%
Total		252,628	100%

=== 2003 ===
==== Declared candidates ====
- Vitaly Bronnikov (SLON), electronics businessman
- Aleksey Dudevich (RP), aide to State Duma member
- Yelena Fomina (Independent), IT director
- Dmitry Matveyev (Independent), children's hockey club president
- Sergey Popov (Yabloko), incumbent Member of State Duma (1996–present)
- Gennady Ravdis (Independent), sambo coach, 1999 candidate for this seat
- Aleksandr Salayev (Independent), nonprofit president
- Vadim Sergiyenko (Independent), people's house director
- Svyatoslav Sokol (CPRF), Member of State Duma (1996–present)
- Oleg Titov (Independent), senior flight attendant at Pulkovo Aviation Enterprise, 2003 gubernatorial candidate
- Vadim Voytanovsky (Rodina), Member of Legislative Assembly of Saint Petersburg (2000–present), 2003 gubernatorial candidate
- Yury Yakovlev (Independent), unemployed
- Viktor Yevtukhov (PVR-RPZh), Member of Legislative Assembly of Saint Petersburg (1998–present)

==== Withdrawn candidates ====
- Inga Burikova (Independent), nonprofit director

==== Did not file ====
- Pavel Babkin (KPR), businessman
- Boris Buzinnik (RPP-PSS), prorector of the Saint Petersburg Academy of Civil Aviation
- Vladimir Popov (Independent), prorector for educational work of the Northwestern Academy of Public Administration
- Natalya Syrkovskaya (LDPR), law firm partner, attorney
- Andrey Vasetsky (ORP Rus'), dean of Northwestern Academy of Public Administration faculty of public and municipal administration

==== Results ====
Summary of the 7 December 2003 Russian legislative election in the South-Western constituency
Candidate	Party	Votes	%
Sergey Popov (incumbent)	Yabloko	62,762	29.25%
Viktor Yevtukhov	Party of Russia's Rebirth-Russian Party of Life	44,758	20.86%
Vadim Voytanovsky	Rodina	24,964	11.63%
Aleksandr Salayev	Independent	24,620	11.47%
Svyatoslav Sokol	Communist Party	13,865	6.46%
Aleksey Dudevich	Development of Enterprise	7,556	3.52%
Dmitry Matveyev	Independent	4,848	2.26%
Oleg Titov	Independent	2,516	1.17%
Gennady Ravdis	Independent	1,734	0.81%
Yelena Fomina	Independent	1,332	0.62%
Vitaly Bronikov	Union of People for Education and Science	673	0.31%
Yury Yakovlev	Independent	658	0.61%
Vadim Sergiyenko	Independent	537	0.25%
against all		21,823	10.17%
Total		214,850	100%
