= Mark Goryachev =

Russian politician and Member of the State Duma (1954–1997)

- Марк Горячев
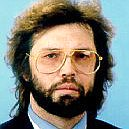

Member of the State Duma from South West constituency
- In office 12 December 1993 – 22 December 1995
- Preceded by: constituency created
- Succeeded by: Sergey Popov

Personal details
- Born: 6 April 1954 Leningrad, Russian SFSR, Soviet Union
- Died: 4 March 1997 (aged 42) Ozerki, Vyborgsky District, Leningrad Oblast, Russia
- Party: Russian Christian Democratic Union (since 1994)
- Other political affiliations: Civic Union (1993)
- Children: 3
- Education: Higher School of International Business, MGIMO

Mark Leonidovich Goryachev (Russian: Марк Леонидович Горячев; 6 April 1954 – March 1997) was a Russian politician and Member of the State Duma (1994–1996).

== Early life ==
Mark Goryachev was born in Leningrad on 6 April 1954. He finished 8 classes of middle school and music college as a guitarist. Later Goryachev got a job in that college as a teacher.

In 1972-1974 Goryachev served in the Soviet Army. Upon completing his service he worked as a grand piano turner.

== Career ==
In 1987 Mark Goryachev founded a grand piano manufacturing cooperative. The cooperative later transformed into a small enterprise "Goryachev Workshop". His business later expanded into industrial investments. In 1992 concern "Goryachev" was established and Mark Goryachev became its president. By 1993 Goryachev's personal wealth was estimated at 4.5 billion rubles.

In May 1992 Goryachev had a personal audience with Pope John Paul II.

Mark Goryachev graduated Higher School of International Business of Moscow State Institute of International Relations in 1993 with a degree in "international marketing and investments". In June 1993 Goryachev was among 5 Russian businessmen invited to the hearing of the US House Subcommittee on International Development, Finance, Trade and Monetary Policy.

In 1993 Mark Goryachev ran for State Duma as No.13 in Civic Union federal list and in the South West constituency of Saint Petersburg. Goryachev also was one of the main sponsors of the Civic Union campaign. In the constituency Goryachev faced 9 opponents, including Soviet dissident Boris Pustyntsev (Choice of Russia), Saint Petersburg City Council deputies Aleksandr Vinnikov (YaBL), Yevgeny Krasnitsky (CPRF) and Galina Spitsa (DPR). Mark Goryachev won election in the constituency with 18.44% of the vote but Civic Union failed to cross a threshold.

In the State Duma Mark Goryachev formed a Financial-Industrial Group of deputies, consisted of 12 members. The group initially negotiated with liberal Union of December 12 but eventually Goryachev's group joined Party of Russian Unity and Accord faction. Mark Goryachev himself became Chairman of the Subcommittee on Investments of the Duma Committee on Property, Privatisation and Economic Activity.

On 14 January 1994 Goryachev got into a fight with LDPR leader Vladimir Zhirinovsky in State Duma cafeteria during their disagreements about order of service.

In May 1994 Mark Goryachev joined Russian Christian Democratic Union political party. During summer of 1994 Goryachev created political Movement of People's Consolidation to participate in by-elections to the Legislative Assembly of Saint Petersburg (reruns were held in 25 constituencies). The campaign was actively sponsored by Goryachev but only 2 of 23 candidates were elected.

In October 1994, during financial crisis in Russia Goryachev suggested Sergey Mavrodi as Minister of Finance on one of the Duma sessions.

During 1995 State Duma election Mark Goryachev ran for re-election in the South West constituency as an independent. However, Goryachev placed second in the constituency with 14.48% of the vote, losing to lawyer Sergey Popov (Yabloko, 20.89%).

== Later life and assassination ==
After losing re-election Mark Goryachev resumed his business activities. In 1996 Goryachev launched a project to restore the Villa of Princess Zinaida Yusupova in Pushkin. The project costs were estimated at $10 million. However, after Goryachev obtained the villa the restoration never started.

On 4 March 1997 near 20 Torzhok Street in Saint Petersburg Mark Goryachev was abducted and taken to an unknown location in a white Zhiguli. As of today, neither Goryachev nor the kidnappers were found.

Rumours spread that the kidnapping was staged by Goryachev himself to avoid persecution for financial fraud. Saint Petersburg Prosecutor's Office found that Goryachev took several loans but hadn't repaid them. Sources say that the entrepreneur started a Ponzi scheme, similar to the one used by Mavrodi, but Goryachev took bank loans to support it.

On 10 February 2023, nearly 26 years since Goryachev's disappearing, Ministry of Internal Affairs finished the investigation. Goryachev was kidnapped at the behest of crime lord Vladimir Kulibaba and brought to Kulibaba's cottage in Vyborgsky District, where the former State duma member was killed, his body dissected and buried in the Gulf of Finland.

== Personal life ==
Mark Goryachev was married. As of 1995, he had 3 children.

Among Goryachev's hobbies were music, guitar playing, horseback riding and tennis. He also was a Catholic.

Mark Goryachev was "Russian Visa" magazine publisher and member of the International Economic Forum.
