= Rybatsky =

Rybatsky (masculine), Rybatskaya (feminine), or Rybatskoye (neuter) may refer to:

- Rybatsky (inhabited locality) (Rybatskaya, Rybatskoye), several rural localities in Russia
- Rybatskoye Municipal Okrug, a municipal okrug in the federal city of St. Petersburg, Russia
- Rybatskoye (Saint Petersburg Metro), a station of the St. Petersburg Metro, St. Petersburg, Russia
