= North-Eastern constituency (Saint Petersburg) =

Russian legislative constituency in Saint Petersburg

North-Eastern single-member constituency
- Constituency of the Russian State Duma
- Deputy: Yekaterina Kondratyeva; United Russia
- Federal subject: Saint Petersburg
- Districts: Kalininsky (Municipal Okrug 21, Finlyandsky, Piskaryovka, Prometey, Severny), Krasnogvardeysky (Bolshaya Okhta, Polyustrovo, Rzhevka), Vyborgsky (Municipal Okrug 15, Sergiyevskoye, Sosnovskoye)
- Voters: 545,728 (2026)

The North-Eastern constituency (No.214) (Note: No.208 in 1993-1995) is a Russian legislative constituency in Saint Petersburg. The constituency covers dense residential and industrial areas in the northern and north-eastern part of the city.

The constituency has been represented since 2026 by United Russia deputy Yekaterina Kondratyeva, former All-Russia People's Front regional office executive chairwoman, who won the open seat after six-term A Just Russia incumbent Yelena Drapeko ran for Legislative Assembly of Leningrad Oblast.

== Boundaries ==
1993 – 1995: Kalininsky District (southern part), Krasnogvardeysky District
The constituency was based in north-eastern Saint Petersburg, covering dense residential and outer industrial areas of the city. Following the 1995 redistricting, the constituency was dissolved to become most of the new Eastern constituency (Krasnogvardeysky District) and part of the Central constituency.

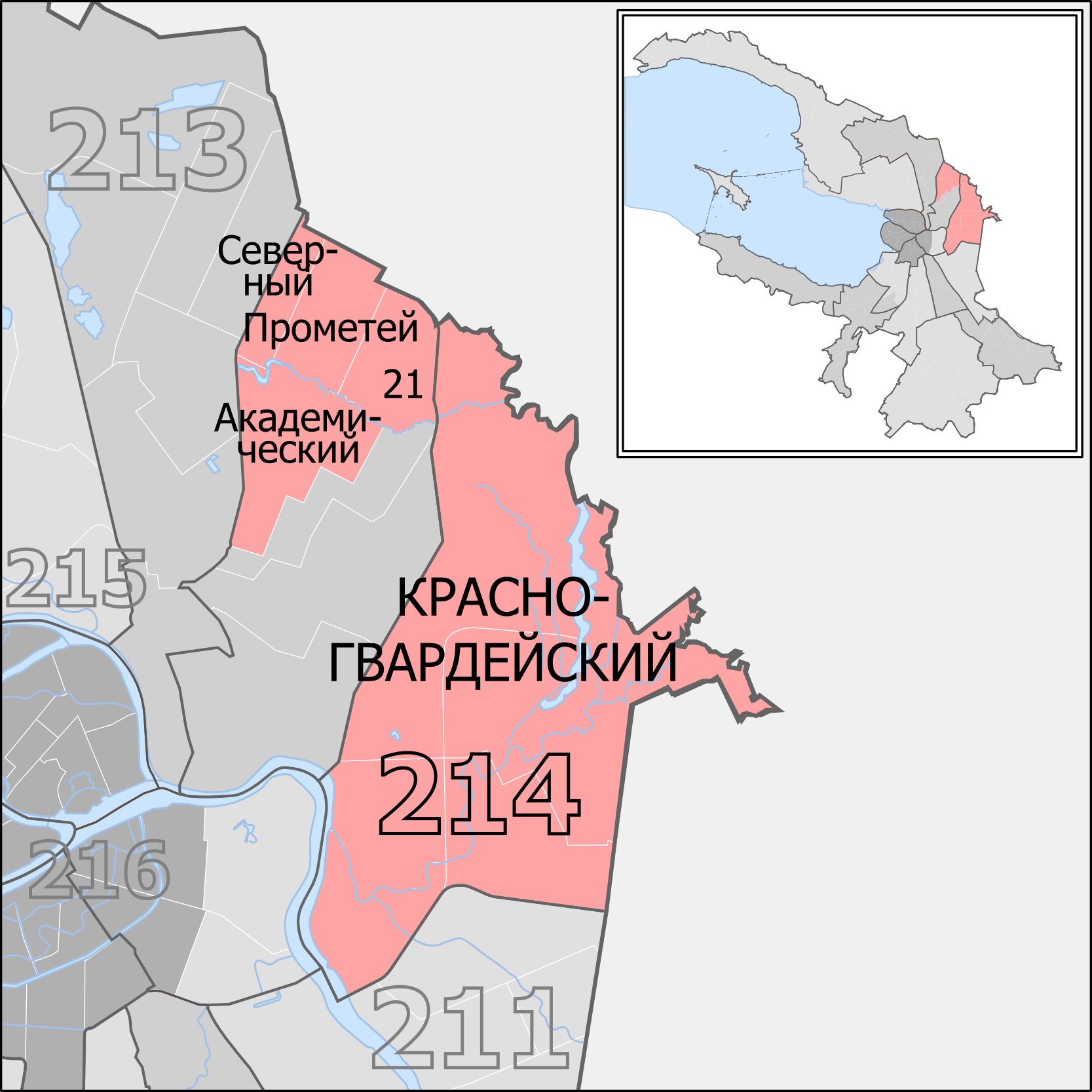
Constituency boundaries from 2016 to 2026

2016 – 2026: Kalininsky District (Municipal Okrug 21, Akademicheskoye, Prometey, Severny), Krasnogvardeysky District
The constituency was re-created for the 2016 election, taking Krasnogvardeysky District from the former Eastern constituency, as well as residential northern Kalininsky District from the Northern constituency.

2026–present: Kalininsky District (Municipal Okrug 21, Finlyandsky, Piskaryovka, Prometey, Severny), Krasnogvardeysky District (Bolshaya Okhta, Polyustrovo, Rzhevka), Vyborgsky District (Municipal Okrug 15, Sergiyevskoye, Sosnovskoye)
After the 2025 redistricting, the constituency was significantly altered, losing Malaya Okhta and Porokhovye in Krasnogvardeysky District to Eastern constituency as well as Akademicheskoye in Kalininsky District to Northern constituency. This seat instead gained the southern Kalininsky District and the residential north-eastern corner of the Vyborgsky District from the Northern constituency.

== Members elected ==
Election	Member	Party
1995	Yuly Rybakov	Independent
1995	Constituency eliminated	
1999	Constituency eliminated	
2003	Constituency eliminated	
2007	Proportional representation - no election by constituency	
2011	Proportional representation - no election by constituency	
2016	Yelena Drapeko	A Just Russia — For Truth
2021	Yelena Drapeko	A Just Russia — For Truth
2026	Yekaterina Kondratyeva	United Russia

== Election results ==
=== 1993 ===
Summary of the 12 December 1993 Russian legislative election in the North-Eastern constituency
Candidate	Party	Votes	%
Yuly Rybakov	Independent	63,268	24.71%
Mikhail Ivanov	Liberal Democratic Party	26,672	10.42%
Viktor Tyulkin	Independent	17,242	6.73%
Valery Ivanov	Independent	16,872	6.59%
Gennady Kravchenko	Independent	15,260	5.96%
Valery Pomeshchikov	Independent	14,801	5.78%
Aleksey Motorin	Independent	13,119	5.12%
Aleksandr Nikiforenko	Yavlinky–Boldyrev–Lukin	10,515	4.11%
Ernst Perchik	Independent	8,252	3.22%
Viktor Talanov	Democratic Party	5,542	2.16%
Aleksandr Filimonov	Russian Democratic Reform Movement	5,290	2.07%
against all		40,168	15.69%
Total		256,070	100%

=== 2016 ===
Summary of the 18 September 2016 Russian legislative election in the North-Eastern constituency
Candidate	Party	Votes	%
Yelena Drapeko	A Just Russia	54,324	34.46%
Mikhail Amosov	Yabloko	19,804	12.56%
Yury Gatchin	Communist Party	17,060	10.82%
Yegor Tratnikov	Liberal Democratic Party	16,960	10.76%
Irina Komolova	Party of Growth	15,372	9.75%
Fyodor Turkin	Patriots of Russia	7,470	4.74%
Andrey Petrov	Rodina	5,322	3.38%
Andrey Pivovarov	People's Freedom Party	5,013	3.18%
Olga Panyuta	Communists of Russia	3,755	2.38%
Ivan Doktorov	Civic Platform	2,089	1.32%
Mikhail Kontorin	Civilian Power	875	0.55%
Total		157,662	100%

=== 2021 ===
Summary of the 17-19 September 2021 Russian legislative election in the North-Eastern constituency
Candidate	Party	Votes	%
Yelena Drapeko (incumbent)	A Just Russia — For Truth	53,866	31.50%
Yelena Rakhova	United Russia	40,891	23.91%
Dmitry Dmitriyev	Communist Party	20,139	11.78%
Dmitry Medvedev	New People	12,907	7.55%
Dmitry Nesterov	Liberal Democratic Party	9,182	5.37%
Kirill Strakhov	Yabloko	8,948	5.23%
Anton Shatilov	Party of Pensioners	6,038	3.53%
Olga Panyuta	Communists of Russia	5,433	3.18%
Andrey Samonov	Rodina	3,289	1.92%
Sergey Myasishchev	Green Alternative	3,247	1.90%
Total		170,995	100%

=== 2026 ===
Summary of the 18-20 September 2026 Russian legislative election in the North-Eastern constituency
Candidate	Party	Votes	%
Yekaterina Kondratyeva	United Russia	147,980	51.61%
Dmitry Panov	New People	40,243	14.04%
Andrey Skoblov	Liberal Democratic Party	36,825	12.84%
Ivan Changli	Communist Party	32,991	11.51%
Vladislav Gorsky	The Greens	15,683	5.47%
Natalya Mironova	A Just Russia	7,949	2.77%
Total		286,732	100%
