= Mikhail Romanov (politician) =

Russian politician

Mikhail Romanov MP
- Михаил Романов
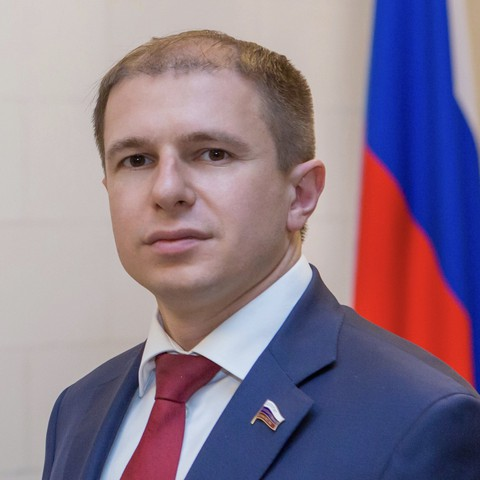

Member of the State Duma for Saint Petersburg
- Incumbent
- Assumed office 12 October 2021
- Preceded by: Igor Divinsky
- Constituency: Eastern St. Petersburg (No. 211)
- In office 5 October 2016 – 12 October 2021
- Preceded by: constituency re-established
- Succeeded by: Oksana Dmitriyeva
- Constituency: St. Petersburg Southeast (No. 217)

Personal details
- Born: 3 November 1984 (age 41) Leningrad, Russian SFSR, USSR
- Party: United Russia
- Education: Northwestern Management Institute

Mikhail Valentinovich Romanov (Russian: Михаил Валентинович Романов; born October 29, 1984, Leningrad) is a Russian political figure and a deputy of the 8th State Duma.

After graduating from the Northwestern Management Institute, Romanov worked at the State Duma as an assistant to the deputy of the 5th State Duma Viktor Zubarev. In 2009, he founded the Foundation for the Promotion of Science, Education, Culture and the Implementation of Social Programs "Northern Capital". From 2016 to 2021, Romanov served as a deputy of the 7th State Duma. In September 2021, he was re-elected for the 8th State Duma from the Saint Petersburg constituency.

In 2018, Romanov was criticized for the lack of meaningful activities as a deputy from the Saint Petersburg constituency. The same year, former drivers from the "Northern Capital" foundation accused Romanov of leaving them without payment.

== Scandals ==
On the night of August 24, 2021, in central St. Petersburg, traffic police stopped a BMW in which State Duma deputy Mikhail Romanov was traveling. The driver was the deputy's 36-year-old driver. The car belongs to a third party. The foreign car carrying the parliamentarian crossed the Annunciation Bridge just moments before it opened. At that moment, the bridge was already closed to traffic. The driver was cited for driving into the oncoming lane. He had been convicted of a similar violation approximately two months earlier. Following initial media reports, Romanov denied the incident, but later apologized and stated that he was sleeping in the backseat at the time of the incident and had no influence on the driver's decision.

In October 2025, Romanov filed a denunciation against singer Diana Loginova and her band, which led to their arrest.

== Sanctions ==
He was sanctioned by the UK government in 2022 in relation to the Russo-Ukrainian War.
