= Aleksandr Mazur (politician) =

Russian politician (1955–2026)

- Александр Мазур

Member of the State Duma
- In office December 1995 – 18 January 2000

Personal details
- Born: Aleksandr Alekseyevich Mazur; 10 March 1955 Leningrad, Soviet Union
- Died: 23 March 2026 (aged 71) Russia
- Party: Yabloko

Aleksandr Alekseyevich Mazur (Russian: Александр Алексеевич Мазур; 10 March 1955 - 23 March 2026), was a Russian politician who served as a member of the State Duma from 1995 to 2000.

== Biography ==
Aleksandr Mazur was born in Leningrad (present-day Saint Petersburg) on 10 March 1955.

He graduated from the Leningrad State University named after A. A. Zhdanov.

In December 1995, in the State Duma elections in St. Petersburg, the Yabloko bloc won six seats in eight constituencies (a Yabloko-endorsed candidate from the Union of Right Forces was elected in another constituency) and two seats on the party lists; six members of the Russian Orthodox Church-YABLOKO became deputies: Yury Nesterov, Sergey Nikiforov, Sergey Popov and Mazur in their constituencies, and with Boris Moiseyev and Aleksandr Shishlov on the party list. He was a member of the State Duma Committee on Budget, Taxes, Banks and Finance. On 18 January 2000, he left parliament.

Mazur died on 23 March 2026.
