= Vitaly Milonov =

Russian politician (born 1974)

Vitaly Milonov MP
- Виталий Милонов
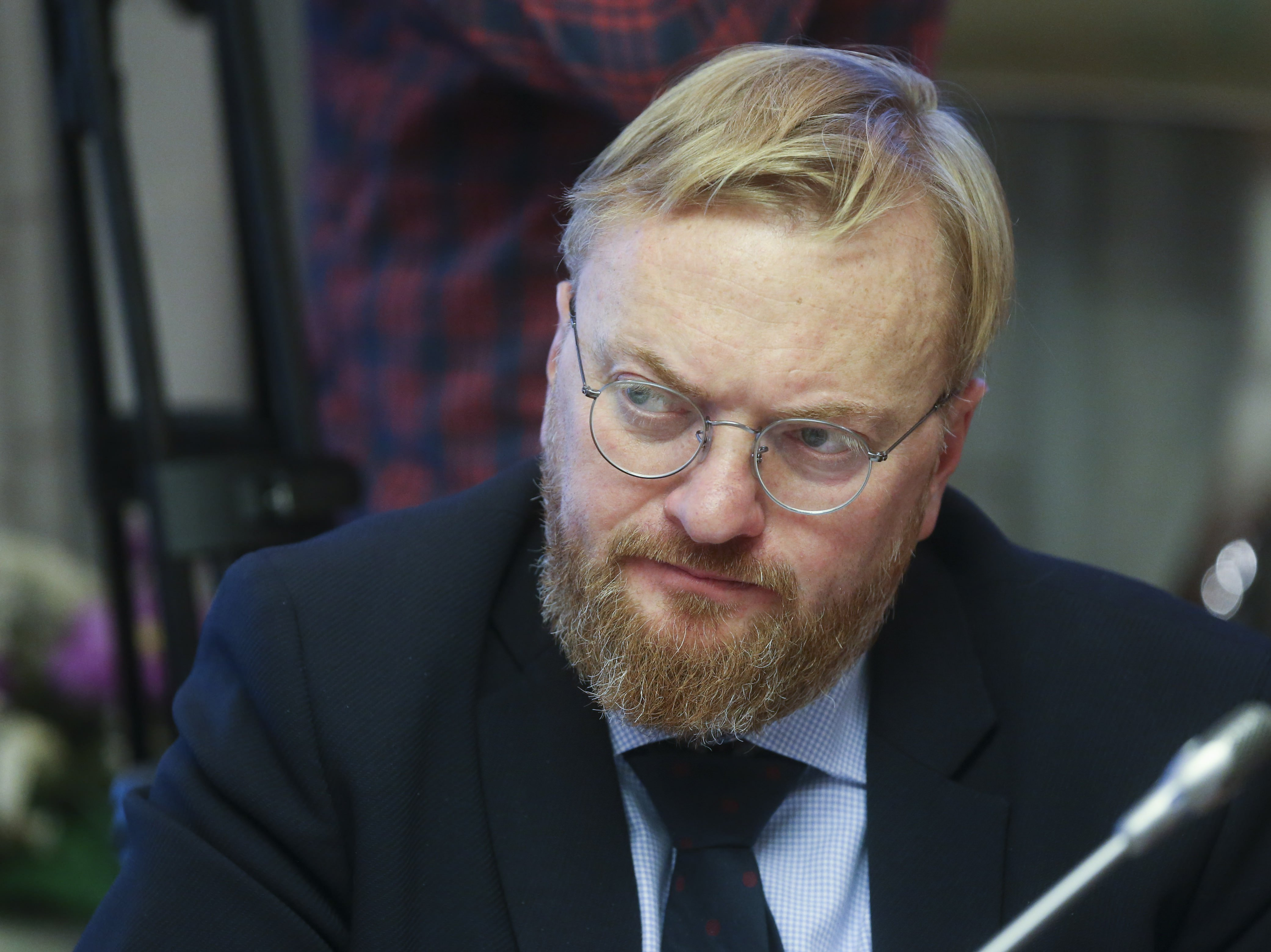
- Milonov in 2018

Member of the State Duma for Saint Petersburg
- Incumbent
- Assumed office 5 October 2016
- Preceded by: constituency re-established
- Constituency: Southern St. Petersburg (No. 218)

Member of the Legislative Assembly of Saint Petersburg
- In office 15 March 2007 – 22 September 2016

Personal details
- Born: 23 January 1974 (age 52) Leningrad, RSFSR, USSR
- Party: United Russia
- Spouse: Eva Liburkina (m. 2008)
- Children: 6
- Parents: Valentin Nikolaevich Milonov (father); Tatyana Evgenievna Milonova (mother)
- Education: RANEPA St. Petersburg
- Religion: Russian Orthodox

Military service
- Allegiance: Russia
- Rank: Junior sergeant
- Battles/wars: 2022 Russian invasion of Ukraine

Vitaly Valentinovich Milonov (Russian: Виталий Валентинович Милонов; born 23 January 1974) is a Russian politician, deputy of the State Duma of the Russian Federation since 2016. A member of United Russia, he has served as a Member of the State Duma for Saint Petersburg South since 2016. As a legislator, he is known for his opposition to LGBT rights in Russia. From 2007 to 2016, he was a Member of the Legislative Assembly of Saint Petersburg.

== Biography ==
After studying Local Governance Administration in the North-West Academy of Public Administration in St. Petersburg, from which he graduated in 2006, he completed a correspondence course at the Saint Tikhon's Orthodox University in Moscow.

His political career began in 1991 when he joined the Free Democratic Party of Russia. From 1994 to 1995, he was an assistant to Vitaly Viktorovich Savitsky, chairman in the 1990s of the existing Christian Democratic Union of Russia (CDU). During this time Milonov was also chairman of the "Young Christian Democrats", a political youth branch of the CDU Russia. Later, he became a friend of Russian politician Galina Starovoitova who supported him politically as well. After the murder of Starovoitova, he turned away from politics. In 2004 he began again his political career at the municipal level as a council member of the community "Dachnoe", in 2005 as head of the city administration of Krasnenkaya Rechka Municipal Okrug in St. Petersburg. In 2007 he successfully ran for elections to the Legislative Assembly of Saint Petersburg and was in his first term Chairman of the Committee for the establishment of the government, local government, and territorial management structure. In 2009, he moved to the Chair of the Committee for legislation. In 2011 he was re-elected as an MLA. While in the legislature, Milonov was the principal sponsor of legislation criminalising "homosexual propaganda directed toward minors". In 2016 elections, he was elected to the State Duma representing United Russia.

== Views ==
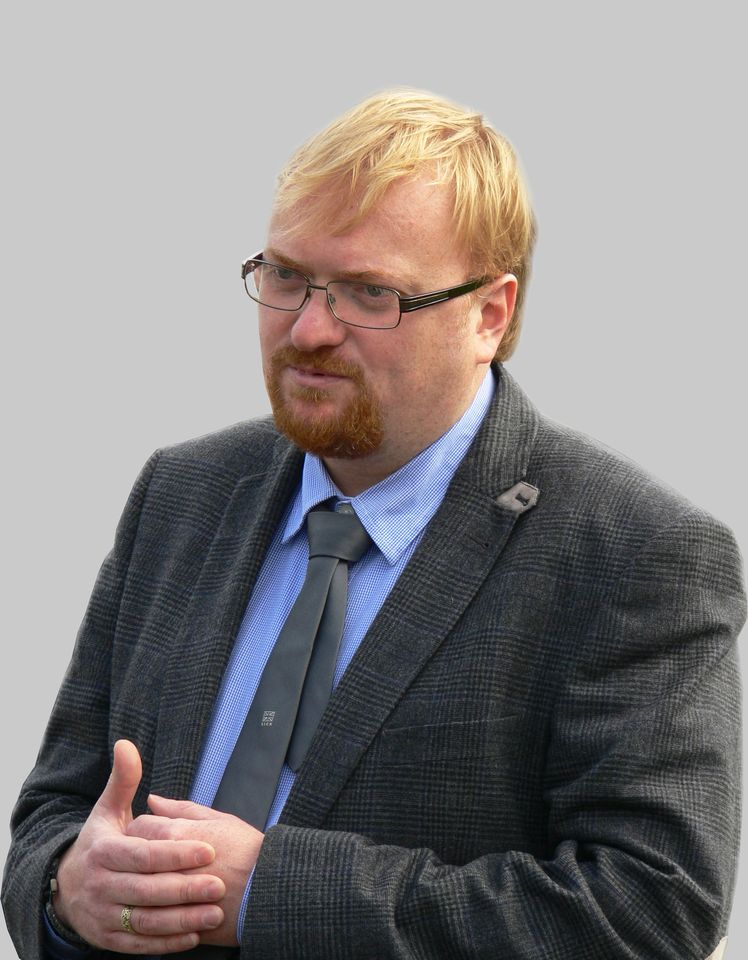
Milonov in 2012

=== Abortion ===
Milonov is a radical opponent of abortion. In 2012 he took the initiative to endow human fetuses with civil rights. The bill was quickly rejected.

=== Homosexuality ===
In 2013, Milonov stated that gay athletes could be subject to arrest at the 2014 Winter Olympics, if promoting homosexuality to minors. He stated, "If a law has been approved by the federal legislature and signed by the president, then the government has no right to suspend it. It doesn't have the authority." Milonov also protested the Side by Side LGBT film festival in November 2013.

On October 30, 2014, Milonov spoke out about Apple CEO Tim Cook's homosexuality and said on the FlashNord website: "What could he bring us? The Ebola virus, AIDS, gonorrhea? They all have unseemly ties over there."

Milonov was interviewed in the 2014 documentary film Campaign of Hate: Russia and Gay Propaganda.

In the BBC documentary Reggie Yates' Extreme, Russia - Gay and Under Attack, when asked if he thought homosexuals were dangerous, Milonov said, "A piece of shit is not dangerous, but it's quite unpleasant to see on the streets. Homosexuality is disgusting. Homophobia is beautiful and natural."

=== Immigration ===
Milonov planned to increase income tax to 30% for enterprises and organizations that employ at least 30% of migrant workers and to save a suitable draft resolution on amendments to the Tax Code of Russia to the Legislative Assembly of St. Petersburg.

=== Foreign policy ===
Milonov supported Armenia in the Karabakh war, as well as the Assad regime and Greece in the Cyprus conflict.

Milonov is anti-Turkish. He declared that Constantinople would be "liberated again" and called for sanctions against Turkey.

=== Single men ===
Milonov has proposed to the Russian Duma that cinema films glorifying single happy men should be banned. He argued that such films can threaten family values. Instead, fathers with many children should be portrayed as positive heroes.

== Controversies ==
=== Antisemitism ===
On 19 March 2014, Milonov reportedly made anti-Semitic statements to the St. Petersburg Legislative Council. According to the svodka.net news website, Milonov stated that Jews "vilify any saint, it is in their tradition of 2,000 years, beginning with the appeals to crucify the Saviour, ending with accusations of anti-Semitism against St. John of Kronstadt." Regarding allegations that St. John of Kronstadt, a 19th-century religious leader, was a supporter of the Black Hundred, Milonov argued that this allegation was based on "complete lies, a modern neo-liberal fable with a sulfuric, deep history of Satanism."

=== Christian fundamentalism ===
Milonov was recognized as an extremist after posting a picture in which he appeared with a gun and a T-shirt with extremist writings Orthodoxy or death. He refused to pay a fine for it and went unpunished due to parliamentary immunity.

=== Other controversies ===
In March 2018, Milonov denounced the British Government's claim that the Russian Government was "highly likely" responsible for the poisoning of Sergei and Yulia Skripal. Comparing the British Prime Minister Theresa May to Adolf Hitler, Milonov claimed that Britain was responsible for the attack and was pushing a "fantasy" for blaming Russia.

On February 24, 2022, at the beginning of Russian invasion of Ukraine, BBC News radio in the USA broadcast an expletive-laced interview with Milonov during which Milonov claimed that the UK, the European Union, and the United States had provoked the invasion. He further claimed that Ukraine's president lacked public support and that Russia had valid rights to keep Ukraine under its influence. Following the mobilization in Russia in September 2022, Milonov was mobilized and sent to the front in Donbas with the rank of junior sergeant to help with an anti-tank artillery battery.

=== Sanctions ===
He was sanctioned by Canada under the Special Economic Measures Act (S.C. 1992, c. 17) in relation to the Russian invasion of Ukraine for Grave Breach of International Peace and Security, and by the UK government in 2022 in relation to Russo-Ukrainian War.

== Personal life ==
Milonov was married to Eva Liburkina between 2008 and 2011, but is now divorced. They raised three children. In 1991 he joined the Baptist church. Later, in 1998, he converted to the Russian Orthodox Church. In 2012, Milonov courted controversy by wearing a shirt bearing the slogan "Orthodoxy or death!".
