= Vladimirsky Municipal Okrug =

Coordinates: 59.9250°N 30.3500°E

Vladimirsky Municipal Okrug муниципальный округ Владимирский
- Municipal okrug
- Vasilyevsky Municipal Okrug on the 2006 map of St. Petersburg
- Country: Russia
- Federal city: St. Petersburg

Population (2010 Census)
  - Total: 59,065
- Website: http://владимирскийокруг.рф

Vladimirsky Municipal Okrug (Russian: Влади́мирский муниципа́льный о́круг) is a municipal okrug in Tsentralny District, one of the eighty-one low-level municipal divisions of the federal city of St. Petersburg, Russia. As of the 2010 Census, its population was 59,065, up from 57,213 recorded during the 2002 Census.

== Geography ==
The municipal okrug borders with Nevsky Avenue in the north, Ligovsky Avenue in the south, Gorokhovaya Street in the west, and with the Fontanka River in the north.

== Economy ==
Rossiya airline has its head office in the municipal okrug.

== Architecture ==
Places of interest include the Vladimirskaya Church and the Corinthia Hotel.
