= Rybatsky (inhabited locality) =

Rybatsky (Russian: Рыбацкий; masculine), Rybatskaya (Рыбацкая; feminine), or Rybatskoye (Рыбацкое; neuter) is the name of several rural localities in Russia:

- Rybatsky (rural locality), a khutor in Starocherkasskoye Rural Settlement of Aksaysky District in Rostov Oblast; 47°14′N 40°1′E
- Rybatskoye (rural locality), a selo in Anivsky District of Sakhalin Oblast
- Rybatskaya, a village in Pechengsky Selsoviet of Kirillovsky District in Vologda Oblast
