= Semyonovsky Municipal Okrug =

Coordinates: 59°55′08″N 30°19′42″E

Semyonovsky Municipal Okrug on the 2006 map of St. Petersburg

Semyonovsky Municipal Okrug (Russian: Семёновский муниципа́льный о́круг), formerly Municipal Okrug #4 (муниципа́льный о́круг № 4), is a municipal okrug of Admiralteysky District of the federal city of St. Petersburg, Russia. Population: 23,322 (2010 census); 29,572 (2002 census).

It borders the Fontanka River in the north, Gorokhovaya Street in the east, Obvodny Canal in the south, and Moskovsky Avenue in the west.

Places of interest include Vitebsky railway station and Saint Petersburg State Institute of Technology.
