= Smolninskoye Municipal Okrug =

Coordinates: 59°56′25″N 30°22′45″E

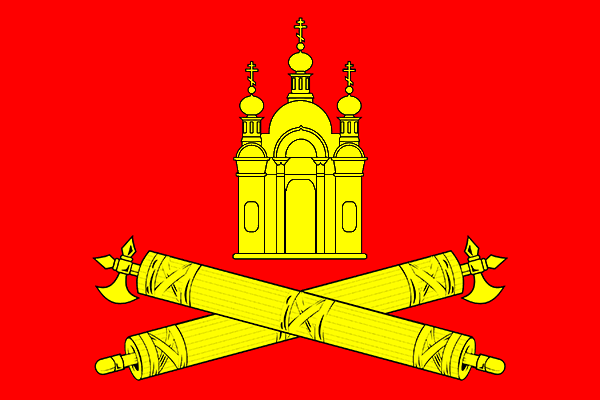

Smolninskoye Municipal Okrug on the 2006 map of St. Petersburg

Smolninskoye Municipal Okrug (Russian: муниципа́льный о́круг Смо́льнинское) is a municipal okrug of Tsentralny District of the federal city of St. Petersburg, Russia. Population: 76,259 (2010 census); 90,337 (2002 census).

The okrug borders the Neva River in the north and in the east, Nevsky Avenue in the south, Chernyshevskogo Avenue and Vosstaniya Street in the west.

Places of interest include the Oktyabrsky Concert Hall, Smolny Institute, Smolny Convent, Suvorov Museum, and Tauride Palace.

In September 2022, during the Russian invasion of Ukraine, the Municipal Council sent a proposal to the State Duma calling for President Putin to be removed from office and tried for high treason. Two deputies were summoned to the local police, accused of "actions aimed at discrediting the Russian government".
