= Nevsky District =

Nevsky District Невский район
- District
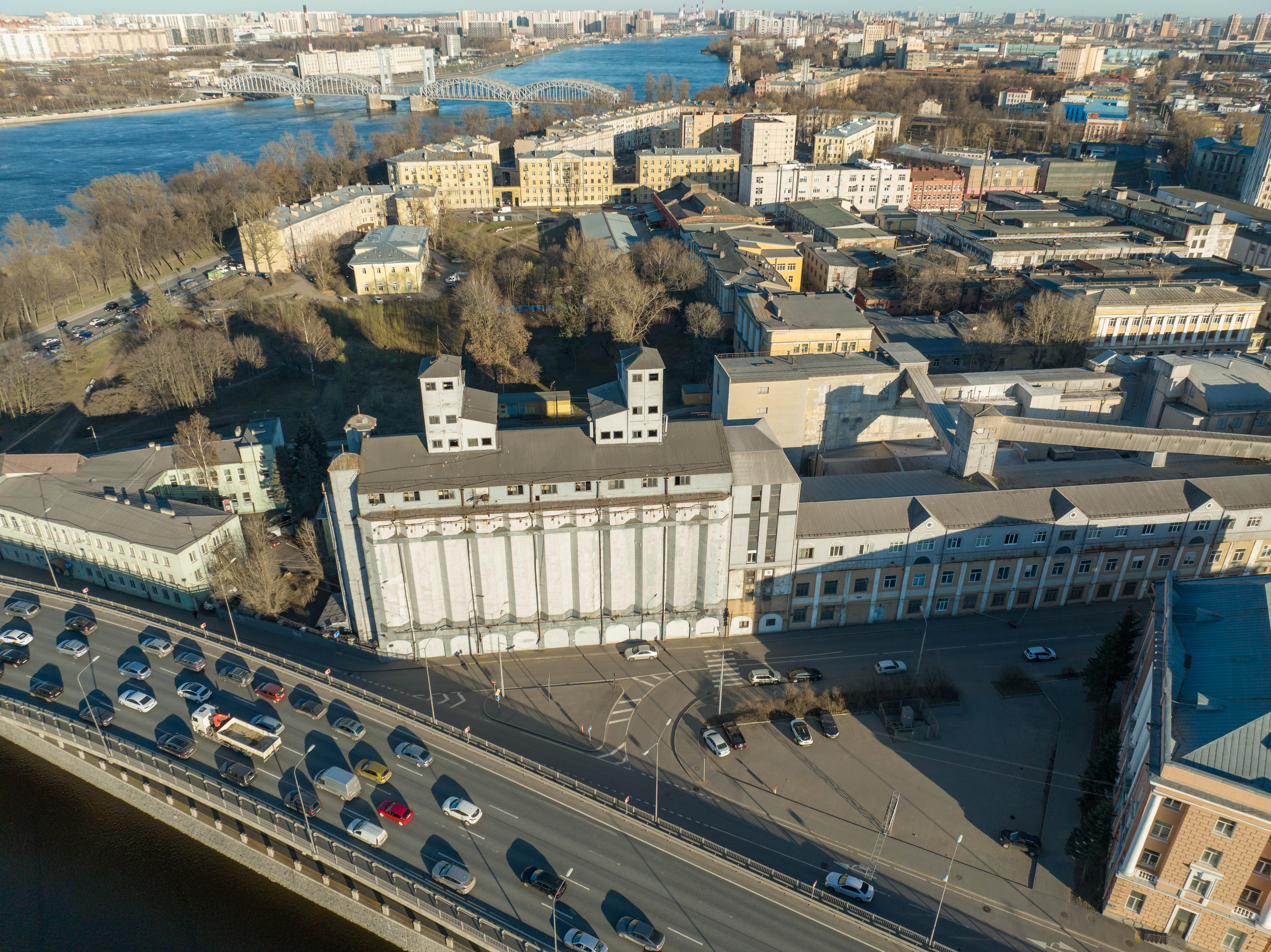
- Nevsky District in St. Petersburg
- Coordinates: 59°52′N 30°28′E
- Country: Russia
- Federal subject: federal city of St. Petersburg
- Established: 1917

Area
  - Total: 61.774 km^{2} (23.851 sq mi)

Population (2010 Census)
  - Total: 466,013
  - Density: 7,543.8/km^{2} (19,538/sq mi)
- Website: http://gov.spb.ru/gov/terr/nevsky/

Nevsky District (Russian: Не́вский райо́н) is a district of the federal city of St. Petersburg, Russia. As of the 2010 Census, its population was 466,013; up from 438,061 recorded in the 2002 Census.

== Geography ==
The district is the only one in St. Petersburg to lie on both banks of the Neva River. It borders with Krasnogvardeysky and Tsentralny Districts in the north, Vsevolozhsky District of Leningrad Oblast in the east, Kolpinsky District in the southeast, and with Frunzensky District in the west.

== History ==
The district was established in 1917.

== Municipal divisions ==
Nevsky District comprises the following nine municipal okrugs:

- #54
- Ivanovsky
- Narodny
- Nevskaya Zastava
- Nevsky
- Obukhovsky
- Okkervil
- Pravoberezhny
- Rybatskoye
