= Izmaylovskoye Municipal Okrug =

Human settlement in Russia

Coordinates: 59°54′27″N 30°18′29″E

Izmaylovskoye Municipal Okrug on the older map of St. Petersburg

Izmaylovskoye Municipal Okrug (Russian: муниципа́льный о́круг Изма́йловское) is a municipal okrug of Admiralteysky District of the federal city of St. Petersburg, Russia. Population: 26,355 (2010 census); 30,415 (2002 census).

It borders the Fontanka River in the north, Moskovsky Avenue in the east, Malaya Mitrofanevskaya Street in the south, and Mitrofanevskoye Highway and Lermontovsky Avenue in the west.

Places of interest include Warsaw Rail Terminal and the Trinity Cathedral.
