= Sergey Popov (politician, born 1960) =

Russian politician

- Сергей Попов

Member of the State Duma for South East Saint Petersburg
- In office 1993–1995

Deputy of the Leningrad City Council of People's Deputies
- In office 1989–1993

Personal details
- Born: Sergey Anatolyevich Popov; 20 April 1960 (age 65) Leningrad, Soviet Union

Sergey Anatolyevich Popov (Russian: Сергей Анатольевич Попов; born on 20 April 1960), is a Russian politician and economist who had last served as the President of the Association of Commercial Banks of St. Petersburg.

Popov also served as a member of the State Duma from 1993 to 1995.

He also served as a Deputy of the Leningrad City Council of People's Deputies from 1989 to 1993.

== Biography ==
Sergey Popov was born on 28 April 1960 in Leningrad in a working-class family. He is a Russian.

=== Education ===
In 1983, he graduated from the Leningrad Polytechnic Institute. M. I. Kalinina, specialty "mechanical engineer of hydraulic engineering".

=== Early career ===
Between 1983 and 1990, he was engaged in scientific and teaching activities at the Department of Hydraulic Engineering of the LPU named after. M. I. Kalinina.

He studied as a postgraduate student at LPI. From 1983 to 1990 he was a member of the CPSU.

In 1989, he participated in the founding congress of the Leningrad People's Front. From 1990 to 1992, he was a deputy of the Leningrad City Council, and was a member of the planning and financial-budgetary commission. In 1992 he became one of the organizers of the New Liberals club.

Between 1992 and 1996, Popov was president and executive director of the Association of Commercial Banks of St. Petersburg.

In 1993, Popov became a member of the State Duma of the Russian Federation of the first convocation from the South-Eastern constituency No. 212, St. Petersburg (won, gaining 17.11% of the vote).

He was a member of the Russia's Choice faction, a member of the Committee on Budget, Taxes, Banks and Finance. In March 1994, he was a member of the initiative group for the creation of the Democratic Choice of Russia (DVR) party. On 14 March 1995, he left the faction and joined the Stability deputy group.

In 1995, he received the qualification "Master of Public Administration" at the Russian Academy of National Economy and Public Administration. He left the State Duma the same year.

From 1996 to 2002 he worked at the Industrial Construction Bank of St. Petersburg. From 2002 to 2010 he worked at CJSC Baltic Bank. In 2010 he was an adviser to the chairman of the board of JSCB Derzhava. Since November 2010, deputy chairman of the Board of JSCB Derzhava.

== Family ==
He is married and has two sons.
