= Municipal Okrug 78 =

Municipal okrug of Tsentralny District of the federal city of St. Petersburg

Coordinates: 59.9333°N 30.3333°E

Municipal Okrug #78 on the 2006 map of St. Petersburg

Municipal Okrug 78 (Russian: муниципа́льный о́круг № 78) is a municipal okrug of Tsentralny District of the federal city of St. Petersburg, Russia. Population: 11,186 (2010 census); 13,508 (2002 census).

The okrug borders Nevsky Avenue in the northeast, the Fontanka River in the south, and Gorokhovaya Street in the west.

Places of interest include the Kazan Cathedral, the Merchant Court, the Apraksin Dvor, the Alexandrinsky Theatre, and the Saint Petersburg City Duma.
