= Oksana Dmitriyeva =

Russian politician and economist

Oksana Dmitriyeva MP
- Оксана Дмитриева
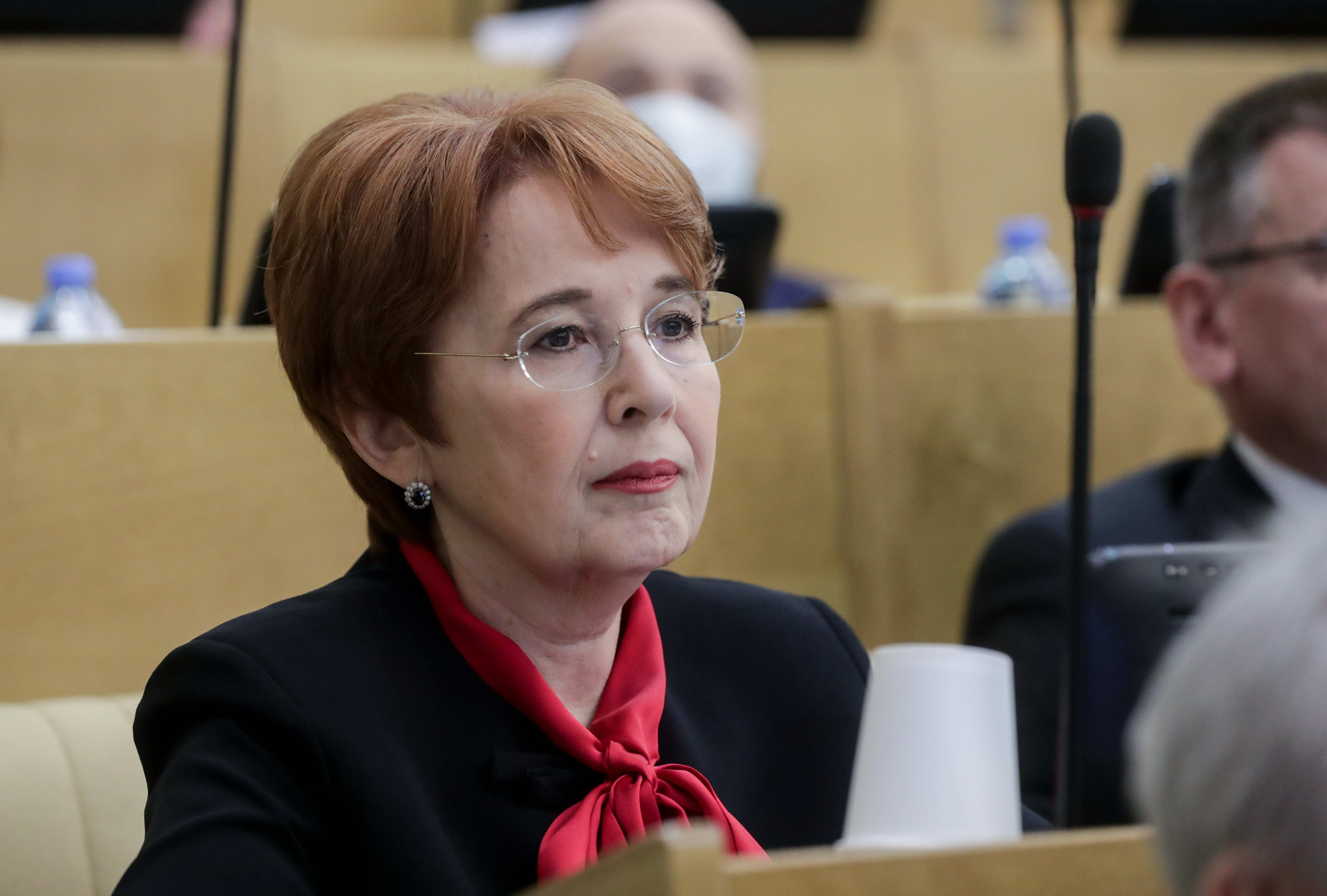
- Dmitriyeva in 2021

Member of the State Duma
- In office 12 October 2021 – 30 September 2026
- Preceded by: Mikhail Romanov
- Succeeded by: Lyubov Yevgorov
- Constituency: Southeast St. Petersburg (No. 217)
- In office 18 January 2000 – 24 December 2007
- Preceded by: Aleksandr Mazur
- Succeeded by: constituencies abolished
- Constituency: Southern St. Petersburg (No. 213)

Member of the Legislative Assembly of Saint Petersburg
- In office 18 September 2016 – 19 September 2021

Member of the State Duma (Party List Seat)
- In office 24 December 2007 – 5 October 2016
- In office 11 January 1994 – 20 May 1998

Minister of Labour
- In office 30 April 1998 – 11 September 1998
- Prime Minister: Sergey Kiriyenko
- Preceded by: Oleg Sysuyev
- Succeeded by: Sergey Kalashnikov

Personal details
- Born: 3 April 1959 (age 67) Leningrad, RSFSR, Soviet Union
- Party: Party of Growth (2016-); Independent (1998-2007, 2015-2016); A Just Russia (2007-2015); Yabloko (1993-1998)
- Education: Saint Petersburg State University of Economics
- Website: www.dmitrieva.org
- Oksana Dmitriyeva's voice Dmitriyeva on the Echo of Moscow program,9 November 2013

Oksana Genrikhovna Dmitriyeva (Russian: Оксана Генриховна Дмитриева; born 3 April 1958) is a Russian politician and economist, who served as a member of the State Duma 2021 to 2026, having previously served in the position from 1993 to 2016. A former government minister in the administration of Boris Yeltsin, she is the most senior member of the Party of Growth in the national legislature and was so in her local legislature.

During her successful 2021 campaign, she was supported by Alexei Navalny's Smart Voting system. In the previous election in 2016, she had lost her seat in a highly controversial election, the results of which she did not recognize. Dmitriyeva has considered running for president several times.

== Biography ==
Oksana Dmitriyeva (sometimes spelled Dmitrieva) was born on April 3, 1958, in Leningrad. Her father Genrikh Rosenberg (1925–2007) was a scientist specialized in ship mechanics. He graduated from the Makarov School and is credited as the creator of Soviet gas turbine installations and worked at the Institute of the Navy until his death. He held the title of Honored Inventor of the Russian Federation. Her grandfather Sholom Rosenberg (1887–1942) was awarded the St. George Cross for bravery in the First World War and was killed during the siege of Leningrad. Her mother Natalia Dmitriyeva (born in 1931) is a candidate of economic sciences, graduate of the Leningrad Institute of Water Transport, and a student of the Nobel laureate Leonid Kantorovich.

In 1980 she graduated from the Faculty of Economic Cybernetics of the Saint Petersburg State University of Economics, specializing in regional economics.

=== 1st term as Deputy of the State Duma ===
In 1993, she was elected as Deputy of the State Duma on the federal list of the Yabloko party. In 1995 she was re-elected. She worked in the State Duma Committee on Budget, Chairman of the Subcommittee on Budget, Extrabudgetary Funds and Intergovernmental Relations. She is the author of the first edition of the Budget Code, adopted in 1998, for which she received the nickname "mother of the Budget Code" among her colleagues. She has developed procedures for considering the federal budget in the State Duma.

=== Minister ===
In May 1998, she was appointed Minister of Labor and Social Development in Sergei Kiriyenko's Cabinet. Simultaneously, she was expelled from the Yabloko party, as the party was in the opposition and did not want to have Ministers in the current government. Dmitriyeva resigned on 30 September 1998, after resignation of the government, and did not receive a post of Minister in the new government.

=== 2nd term as Deputy of the State Duma ===
In December 1999, she was elected to the 3rd convocation of the State Duma as an independent candidate. She served as deputy chairman of the State Duma Committee on Budget and Taxes.

She has submitted for consideration to the State Duma a package of bills targeting an improvement of the social status of the poorest part of the Russian population. In 2000, she achieved the law on granting the status of a WWII participant to persons awarded with the medal "For the Defence of Leningrad". When considering the law "On labor pensions", the right of working pensioners to receive pensions was fully upheld. She has made a number of bills providing improvement of the budgetary and tax legislation. Such amendments were adopted to the 2001 budget as an amendment to the return of personal income tax to regions (St. Petersburg received an additional 2 billion rubles from this), investments in the construction of a subway in St. Petersburg increased by 550 million rubles.

In 2000 she headed the "Block of Oksana Dmitriyeva" in the municipal elections in St. Petersburg. The campaign ended in a serious victory: block received more than 100 seats in municipal authorities.

In the 2003 elections she was again elected, to the 4th convocation of the State Duma. In 2006, Oksana Dmitriyeva developed a package of bills aimed at stimulating innovation. 13 bills contained measures aimed at reducing the tax component in the price of a scientific and innovative product, which would allow to expand the possibilities for conducting research and creating an innovative product. However, all bills were rejected by the State Duma. Some of these bills were later changed and, in the modified form without the most significant items, introduced from the Government of the Russian Federation.

In the 2007 elections, she was elected to the 5th convocation of the State Duma on A Just Russia party ticket. She was the first deputy head of the faction "A Just Russia: Motherland / Pensioners / Life". Member of the State Duma Committee on Budget and Taxes. In 2007, Oksana Dmitriyeva developed 6 bills aimed at adjusting the pension legislation and allowing a qualitative change in the standard of living of current pensioners. In particular, it was proposed to index the pension in accordance with the growth of wages, to increase the ratio of the individual wage to the national average, to restore the so-called "non-insurance periods", grant the right to receive a second pension to the workers of the home front, prisoners of Nazi concentration camps, as well as war veterans who do not have a disability. These bills were rejected by the State Duma.

She was the author of alternative draft budgets of the Russian Federation for 2009, 2010 and 2011, 2012, 2013, which the Just Russia fraction introduced to the State Duma simultaneously with the governmental projects. Consistent opponent of Finance Minister Alexei Kudrin in the creation of the Stabilization Fund and the introduction of a funded part of the pension. Furthermore, she was the main political opponent to the Governor of Saint Petersburg, and later to the senator and Federation Council Chairwoman Valentina Matvienko.

In 2012, Dmitriyeva was considered as a possible candidate for the post of President of Russia from the A Just Russia party, but Sergey Mironov was nominated instead, who promised to appoint Oksana Dmitriyeva as Prime Minister, in case of victory in the election. However, Sergey Mironov lost the election.

In 2014, she tried to participate in the election of the Governor of St. Petersburg, but was unable to collect enough signatures of municipal deputies in her support (this is a necessary condition for participating in elections).

In early March 2015, as a result of the raider seizure, Oksana Dmitriyeva was removed from the leadership of the St. Petersburg regional branch of the party, on March 30 she wrote a statement on the withdrawal from the party "A Just Russia". In April 2015, deprived of the post of deputy head of the faction "A Just Russia" in the State Duma of Russia. Also, the husband of Oksana Dmitriyeva, Ivan Grachev, was removed from the post of chairman of the State Duma committee on energy.

=== 2016 parliamentary election ===
In July 2016, Oksana Dmitriyeva headed the lists of the Party of Growth in the State Duma election (2nd in the federal list after Boris Titov) and the Legislative Assembly of St. Petersburg (1st place in the list). She also ran in the 217th South-East single-mandate Constituency of St. Petersburg.

During the campaign against Oksana Dmitriyeva, "black technologies" were used (in particular, candidates of namesake were nominated). Outdoor advertising with the image of Oksana Dmitriyeva was broken or damaged, anonymous newspapers were published against her. During the voting, mass violations were noted at the polling stations, counting of votes was also conducted with violations, which was noted by representatives of the Central Election Commission. Oksana Dmitryieva lost the election in her constituency, but she said she did not recognize the results and appealed to the prosecutor's office demanding investigation of violations and cancellation of election results in this constituency.

At the simultaneous elections to the Legislative Assembly of St. Petersburg, the list of the Party of Growth, headed by Oksana Dmitriyeva, received 10.7% of all votes. According to the results of elections Oksana Dmitriyeva was elected to the St. Petersburg Legislative Assembly of the Party of Growth.

=== 2018 Presidential election ===
In July 2017, Oksana Dmitriyeva began to participate in the primaries of the Party of Growth, for the selection of a presidential candidate in the 2018 election.

=== 3rd term as Deputy of the State Duma ===
In September 2021 Dmitriyeva was elected member of the 8th State Duma in the South East constituency of Saint Petersburg, earning 34.91% of the vote. She became the first Duma deputy from the Party of Growth. Unlike other minor party MPs and independents, Dmitriyeva refused to join any faction.

== Family ==
She is married to Ivan Grachev, a deputy of the Russian State Duma of several convocations.

Their son, Dmitry, was born in 1995 and graduated from the Faculty of Physics of Lomonosov Moscow State University.

In her free time, Dmitrieva enjoys swimming and alpine skiing.
