= Yury Nesterov =

Soviet boxer

Personal information
- Nationality: Soviet
- Born: 29 July 1946 (age 79)

Sport
- Sport: Boxing

Yury Nesterov (born 29 July 1946) is a Soviet boxer. He competed in the men's heavyweight event at the 1972 Summer Olympics. At the 1972 Summer Olympics, he lost to Duane Bobick of the United States.
