= Rybatskoye Municipal Okrug =

Coordinates: 59°50′N 30°31′E

Rybatskoye Municipal Okrug муниципальный округ Рыбацкое
- Municipal okrug
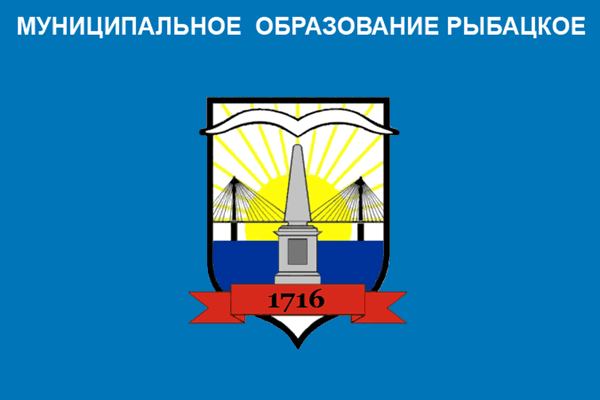
- Flag

- Rybatskoye on the 2006 map of St. Petersburg
- Country: Russia
- Federal city: St. Petersburg

Population (2023)
  - Total: 69 959
- Website: https://rybmo.ru/

Rybatskoye Municipal Okrug (Russian: муниципа́льный о́круг Рыба́цкое), formerly Municipal Okrug 52 (муниципа́льный о́круг №52), is a municipal okrug of Nevsky District of the federal city of St. Petersburg, Russia, located in the far southeastern area of the city along the banks of the Neva River. Population: 55,076 (2010 census); 49,537 (2002 census).

The okrug is served by the St. Petersburg Metro; its station being the southern terminus of the Nevsko-Vasileostrokvskaya Line (Line 3). The metro station is also the location of the entrance to Rybatskoye railway station, which serves trains to nearby towns in the south of the city. A new railway station entrance and shopping arcade has recently been constructed to coincide with other regional redevelopment.

The okrug functions predominantly as a dormitory region for the city, and comprises apartment blocks of varying ages and typical convenience stores. In recent years, Rybatskoye saw a great deal of construction work, and now boasts several small shopping arcades and supermarkets. In addition, there is some light industry which tends to be located to the west of the metro station and to the south of the okrug.

The eastern boundary of the okrug is marked by the Neva River, which helps to boost the okrug's greenery and nature, making it a pleasant spot for lovers of the outdoors.
