= Ligovka-Yamskaya Municipal Okrug =

Ligovka-Yamskaya Municipal Okrug муниципальный округ Лиговка-Ямская
- Municipal okrug
- Ligovka-Yamskaya Municipal Okrug on the 2006 map of St. Petersburg
- Coordinates: 59°55′N 30°23′E
- Country: Russia
- Federal city: St. Petersburg

Population (2010 Census)
  - Total: 16,825
- Website: http://ligovka-yamskaya.sankt-peterburg.info

Ligovka-Yamskaya Municipal Okrug (Russian: муниципа́льный о́круг Ли́говка-Ямска́я) is a municipal okrug in Tsentralny District, one of the eighty-one low-level municipal divisions of the federal city of St. Petersburg, Russia. As of the 2010 Census, its population was 16,825, up from 14,740 recorded during the 2002 Census.

== Geography ==
The municipal okrug borders Nevsky Avenue in the north, the Neva River in the east, Obvodny Canal in the south, and Ligovsky Avenue in the west.

== Architecture ==
Places of interest include the Moskovsky railway terminal and Alexander Nevsky Lavra.
