= Svyatoslav Sokol =

Russian politician (1946–2022)

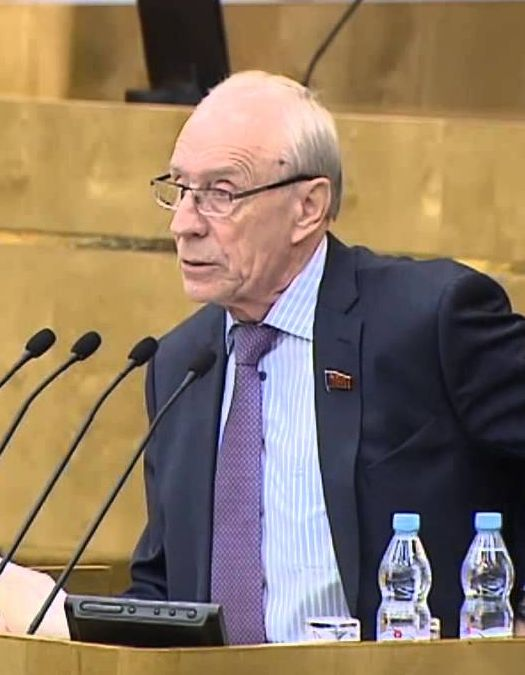
- Sokol in 2015

Member of the State Duma
- In office 24 December 2007 – 5 October 2016
- In office 17 December 1995 – 7 December 2003

Personal details
- Born: Svyatoslav Mikhailovich Sokol; 22 March 1946 Bukarava, Talachyn District, Vitebsk Oblat, Byelorussian SSR, USSR
- Died: 3 December 2022 (aged 76)
- Party: CPRF
- Education: Moscow State University of Geodesy and Cartography
- Occupation: Editor

Svyatoslav Mikhailovich Sokol (Russian: Святослав Михайлович Сокол; 22 March 1946 – 3 December 2022) was a Russian editor and politician. A member of the Communist Party of the Russian Federation, he served in the State Duma from 1995 to 2003 and again from 2007 to 2016. A member of the Central Committee of the CPRF and the First Secretary of the Saint Petersburg City Committee of the CPRF (until 2013). He served as a member of the Presidium of the Central Committee of the CPRF in 2004–2008 and 2013–2017.

Sokol died of a heart attack on 3 December 2022, at the age of 76.
