= Porokhovye Municipal Okrug =

Porokhovye Municipal Okrug муниципальный округ Пороховые
- Municipal okrug
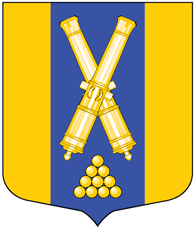
- Coat of arms

- Porokhovye Municipal Okrug on the 2006 map of St. Petersburg
- Coordinates: 59°57′N 30°28′E
- Country: Russia
- Federal city: St. Petersburg

Population (2010 Census)
  - Total: 129,651
- Website: http://www.мопороховые.рф

Porokhovye Municipal Okrug (Russian: муниципа́льный о́круг Пороховы́е) is a municipal okrug in Krasnogvardeysky District, one of the eighty-one low-level municipal divisions of the federal city of St. Petersburg, Russia. As of the 2010 Census, its population was 129,651, up from 123,583 recorded during the 2002 Census.
