= Boris Pustyntsev =

Russian human rights activist (1935–2014)

Boris Pavlovich Pustyntsev
- Борис Павлович Пустынцев
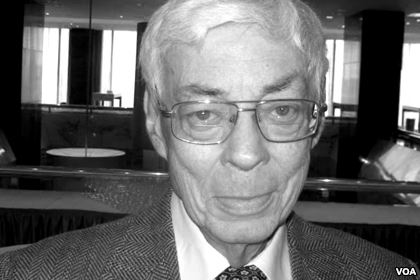
- Born: June 2, 1935; Vladivostok, Soviet Union
- Died: March 4, 2014 (aged 78); Saint Petersburg
- Citizenship: Soviet Union (1935–1991) → Russian Federation (1991–2014)
- Occupation: translator
- Known for: human rights activism
- Movement: dissident movement in the Soviet Union

Boris Pavlovich Pustyntsev (Russian: Бори́с Па́влович Пусты́нцев, 2 June 1935, Vladivostok – 4 March 2014, Saint Petersburg) was a Russian human rights activist. He was best known as chairman of the charitable organisation St. Petersburg NGO. He was born in Vladivostok, Primorsky Krai, Soviet Union.

Pustyntsev died after a long illness on 4 March 2014 in Saint Petersburg, Russia. He was 78 years old.
