= Civic Union (Russia) =

Civic Union Гражданский союз
- Abbreviation: GS (English); ГС (Russian)
- Leader: Arkady Volsky
- Founders: Arkady Volsky; Nikolay Travkin; Alexander Rutskoy
- Founded: 21 June 1992
- Dissolved: November 1994
- Preceded by: Democratic Russia
- Succeeded by: Russian Civil Union (Third Force)
- Ideology: Association: Social democracy Anti-Yeltsinism; Federalism; Electoral bloc: Centrism
- Political position: Association: Centre to centre-left Electoral bloc: Centre
- Member parties: VSO; DPR (until May 1993); NP SR; Smena

The Civic Union (Russian: Гражданский союз, Grazhdanskiy soyuz, GS) was a political alliance in Russia.

== History ==
=== Political bloc "Civic Union" ===
Civic Union was established on 21 June 1992 at the Forum of public organisations "Civic Union" as the political bloc of centrist forces. The bloc consisted of All-Russian Union "Renewal" (VSO), Democratic Party of Russia (DPR), People's Party "Free Russia" (NPSR), youth organisations of DPR and NPSR, parliamentary faction Smena — New Politics, Russian Union of Youth (RSM, legal successor to All-Union Leninist Young Communist League) and several prominent public figures.

At the Forum a policy document — "Area of Consent of the Civic Union" — was approved. Bloc's founders proposed "immediate and radical correction of social-economic policy" to rescue state-owned enterprises and to support the needs of the population, creation of "collegial body of the Commonwealth" to restore connections between former Soviet republics, "Commonwealth citizenship" and "unified professional armed forces". Opposition to the political radicalism was also proclaimed, including a refusal to try legislative authorities' dissolution. A governing body — Political Council — was also elected, the Council comprised leaders of founding organisations: Arkady Volsky (VSO), Nikolay Travkin (DPR), Aleksandr Rutskoy (NPSR), Andrey Golovin (Smena), Andrey Bogdanov (Youth Union of DPR, MSDPR), Vyacheslav Lashchevsky (RSM) and Oleg Sokolov (Youth Movement "Free Russia", MDSR). In September coordinator of parliamentary factions Free Russia, Non-partisan Deputies and Left Centre joined the bloc, with representatives of Non-partisan Deputies, Left Centre and Sovereignty and Equality elevated to the Political Council. The Political Consultative Council was created with 6 experts from each member organisation.

Officially, the agreement on bloc's establishment was signed at the Political Council session on 19 November 1992. At the same session coordinator of Sovereignty and Equality joined the bloc. In autumn a political programme was adopted, which proposed premier-presidential system, administrative-territorial reform and reorganisation of Commonwealth of Independent States into a confederation. Civic Union's experts also developed an anti-crisis programme "Twelve steps away from the abyss", under which state-owned enterprises would return to governmental administration, protectionism would be used to support domestic producers, conversion of munitions facilities would be held and natural tax on extractive industries would be imposed.

In autumn 1992 Civic Union was among most powerful political forces in Russia. Especially, the bloc's power became evident at the VII Congress of People's Deputies of Russia (1—12 December 1992), when acting prime minister Yegor Gaidar was deposed and replaced with Viktor Chernomyrdin.

=== Politico-economic association "Civic Union" ===
On 9 February 1993 Civic Union's co-founders registered in the Ministry of Justice a politic-economic association with the same name. Board of founders consisted of Vasily Lipitsky (NPSR), Valery Khomyakov (DPR), Aleksandr Vladislavlev (VSO), Andrey Golovin (Smena), Vyacheslav Lashchevsky (RSM), Oleg Sokolov (MDSR) and Andrey Bogdanov (MSDPR). Viktor Yermakov was appointed as executive director. During 1993 several centre-left parties joined the association: Russian Social Democratic Centre of Oleg Rumyantsev, Socialist Party of Workers and Party of Labour.

1993 was characterised with deepening of the political crisis and radicalisation of parliamentary opposition. As the result, tensions arose between hardline centrists (Vladislavlev, parts of DPR and NPSR) and opposition-leaning members (Smena — New Politics, parts of NPSR and DPR), which led to the decline in Union's influence on the people's deputies. After the April 1993 referendum the bloc started to fall apart: in May DPR decided to pull out its representatives and in August members of VSO left the Civic Union's leadership. In the middle of 1993 moderate wing of the bloc clashed with Vice President Aleksandr Rutskoy due to the latter's partnership with radical anti-Yeltsin opposition, which was not in line with the bloc's declared centrist position. During the October 1993 political crisis association's leadership supported a "zero option": mutual repeal of presidential and parliamentary decrees aimed at each other and span presidential and parliamentary elections. Vice President Rutskoy, unhappy with the bloc's peaceful stance, left the Civic Union. As the result, 1993 constitutional crisis brought an ed to Civic Union's original form.

=== Electoral bloc "Civic Union" ===
In October 1993 association "Civic Union" became a co-founder of the electoral bloc Future of Russia–New Names (BR-NI), However, several members of the association's leadership led by Arkady Volsky and Aleksandr Volsky decided to run in the upcoming legislative election separately and created electoral bloc "Civic Union in the Name of Stability, Justice and Progress". The bloc was joined by Civic Union's executive committee chairman Vasily Lipitsky. Seven organisations were co-founders of the Civic Union electoral bloc:

- Russian Union of Industrialists and Entrepreneurs
- All-Russian Union "Renewal"
- Russian Social Democratic Centre
- Association of Industrialists and Entrepreneurs of Russia
- Trade Union for Workers of Forestry
- Trade Union for Workers of Construction and Building-Materials Industry
- Movement "War Veterans — For Peace"

Civi Union's party list was approved on 21 October 1993. The federal list was headed by RSPP president Arkady Volsky, general director of Kamaz Nikolay Bekh and VSO co-chairman Aleksandr Vladislavlev. Several prominent figures joined the bloc, including jurist Oleg Rumyantsev, former first secretary of VLKSM Viktor Mironenko, admiral Vladimir Chernavin, singer Iosif Kobzon, former Vice Chairman of the Supreme Soviet of Russia Vladimir Ispravnikov, economists Igor Yurgens and Iosif Diskin, philosopher Aleksandr Tsipko, journalists Pavel Voshchanov and Anatoly Yurkov, former chairman of the Soviet of the Union Konstantin Lubenchenko, sociologist Fyodor Burlatsky, general Valery Ochirov, cosmonaut Svetlana Savitskaya and businessman Alisher Usmanov.

A total of 78 directors of enterprises, 29 chairmen of unions of industrialists and entrepreneurs and 35 businessmen joined Civic Union party list. Civic Union also received support from multiple industrial and financial organisations, including concern Goryachev, concern DeKo, JSC Diamonds of Russia — Sakha, Telebank and commercial bank Moskva. The bloc could receive some administrative support, as several regional officials joined Civic Union: President of Ingushetia Ruslan Aushev (later withdrew), vice premiers of Kabardino-Balkaria, Khakassia and Udmurtia, deputy governors of Astrakhan Oblast, Oryol Oblast, Rostov Oblast and Smolensk Oblast.

In the general election on 12 December 1993 Civic Union won only 1.93% of popular vote and placed 10th among 13 political parties and blocs, failing to cross a 5% threshold. However, 10 Civic Union candidates won in single-mandate constituencies:

- Artur Chilingarov (Nenets)
- Mark Goryachev (South West)
- Konstantin Laikam (Ryazan)
- Vasily Lipitsky (Zayeltsovsky)
- Igor Muravyov (Pravoberezhny)
- Mikhail Putilov (Kungur)
- Sergey Shulgin (Arkhangelsk)
- Vladimir Utkin (Sovetsky)
- Andrey Zakharov (Blagoveshchensk)
- Sergey Zenkin (Kineshma)

In addition, 11 Civic Union-supported candidates were elected to the State Duma:

- Andrey Aizderdzis (Independent, Mytishchi)
- Sergey Boskholov (Independent, Ust-Orda Buryat)
- Anatoly Guskov (BR-NI, Lyubertsy)
- Aleksey Krasnykh (PRES, Izhevsk)
- Vladimir Kravtsov (Independent, Berezniki)
- Viktor Mashinsky (Independent, Angarsk)
- Nikolay Stolyarov (Independent, Noginsk)
- Vladimir Surenkov (Independent, Borzya)
- Yury Ten (Independent, Irkutsk)
- Aleksandr Tsapin (Independent, Avtozavodsky)
- Vladimir Zelenin (Independent, Leninsky)

As at least 35 deputies could create a faction in the State Duma, Civic Union-aligned deputies joined different factions. Seven members of Mark Goryachev's Financial-Industrial Group joined PRES, another seven — New Regional Politics deputies' group, and CPRF, APR, Women of Russia, Yabloko and Union of 12 December were joined by one member each. Vasily Lipitsky and Andrey Zakharov remained Independent for the rest of their term.

In the concurrent election to the Federation Council 4 candidates supported by the Civic Union were elected: former chairman of Mossoviet Nikolay Gonchar, First Deputy Governor of Moscow Oblast Anatoly Dolgolaptev, Governor of Irkutsk Oblast Yury Nozhikov and former federal Minister of Industry Aleksandr Titkin (in Tula Oblast).

In November 1994 representatives of the Civic Union, All-Russian Union "Renewal" and newly-formed Party of Majority established Russian Civil Union (Third Force). The new bloc unified mainly small political parties and eventually disintegrated by 1996. In the 1995 election Arkady Volsky became the leader of Trade Unions and Industrialists – Union of Labour, while Aleksandr Vladislavlev was included into the Forward, Russia! party list.

== Electoral history ==
=== Federal parliamentary elections ===
Election	Leader	Votes	%	Seats	+/–	Rank	Government
1993	Arkady Volsky	1,038,193	1.93	10 / 450		10th	Opposition
