= Tsentralny District, Saint Petersburg =

Tsentralny District Центральный район (Russian)
- District
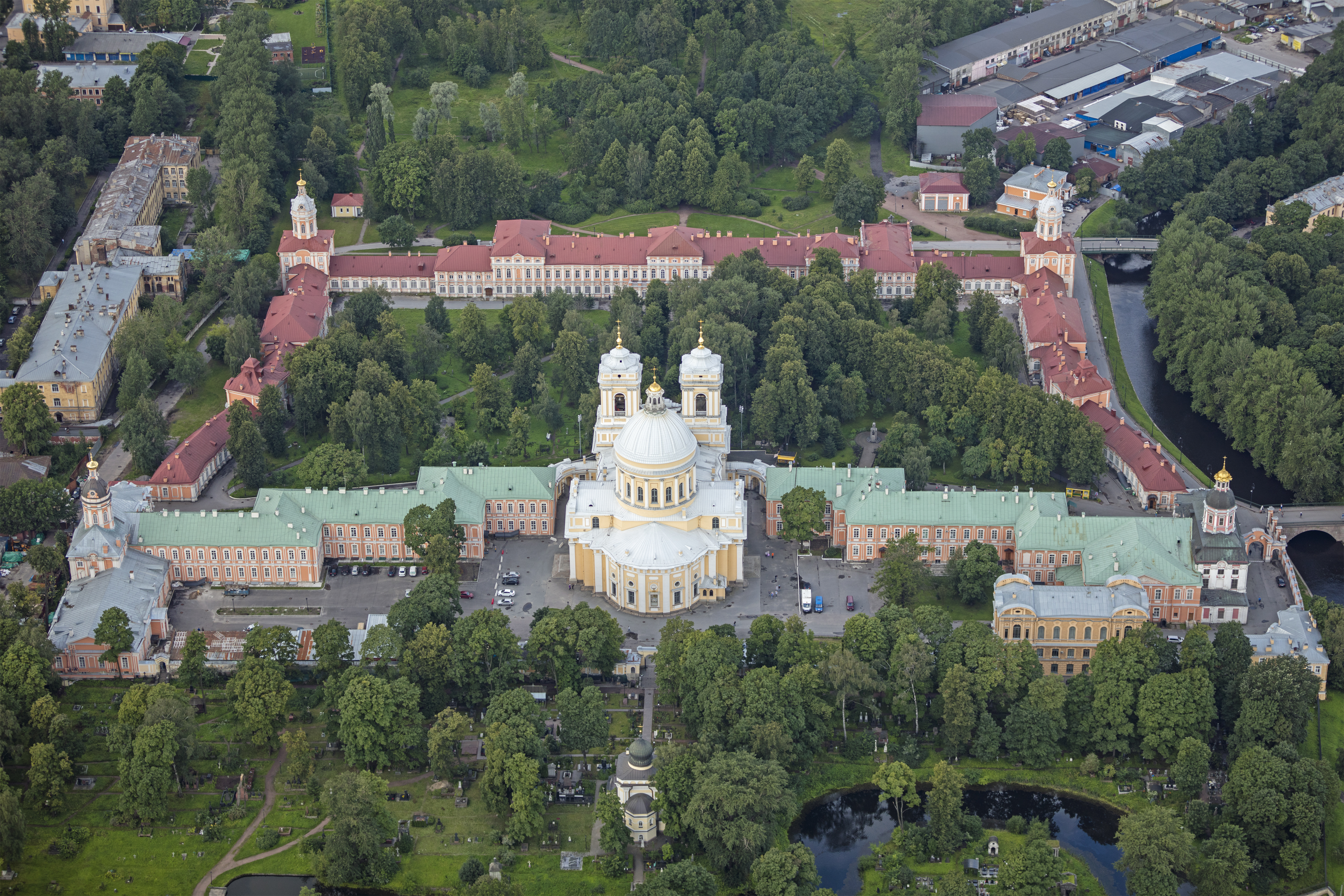
- Saint Alexander Nevsky Monastery, Tsentralny District
- Tsentralny District on the 2006 map of St. Petersburg
- Coordinates: 59°56′12″N 30°21′39″E
- Country: Russia
- Federal subject: federal city of St. Petersburg
- Established: March 11, 1994

Area
  - Total: 17.12 km^{2} (6.61 sq mi)

Population (2010 Census)
  - Total: 214,625
  - Density: 12,540/km^{2} (32,470/sq mi)
- Website: http://gov.spb.ru/gov/terr/reg_center/

Tsentralny District (Russian: Центра́льный райо́н) is a district of the federal city of St. Petersburg, Russia. As of the 2010 Census, its population was 214,625; down from 236,856 recorded in the 2002 Census.

== Geography ==
The district borders the Neva River in the north and in the east, Obvodny Canal in the south, and areas around the Gorokhovaya Street in the west.

== History ==
The district was established on March 11, 1994 as a result of the merger of Dzerzhinsky, Kuybyshevsky, and Smolninsky Districts.

== Municipal divisions ==
Tsentralny District comprises the following six municipal okrugs:

- #78
- Dvortsovy
- Ligovka-Yamskaya
- Liteyny
- Smolninskoye
- Vladimirsky

== Economy ==
Head office of the Rossiya airline is located in Vladimirsky Municipal Okrug of the district.
