= Sergey Popov (politician, born 1948) =

Russian politician (born 1948)

- Сергей Попов
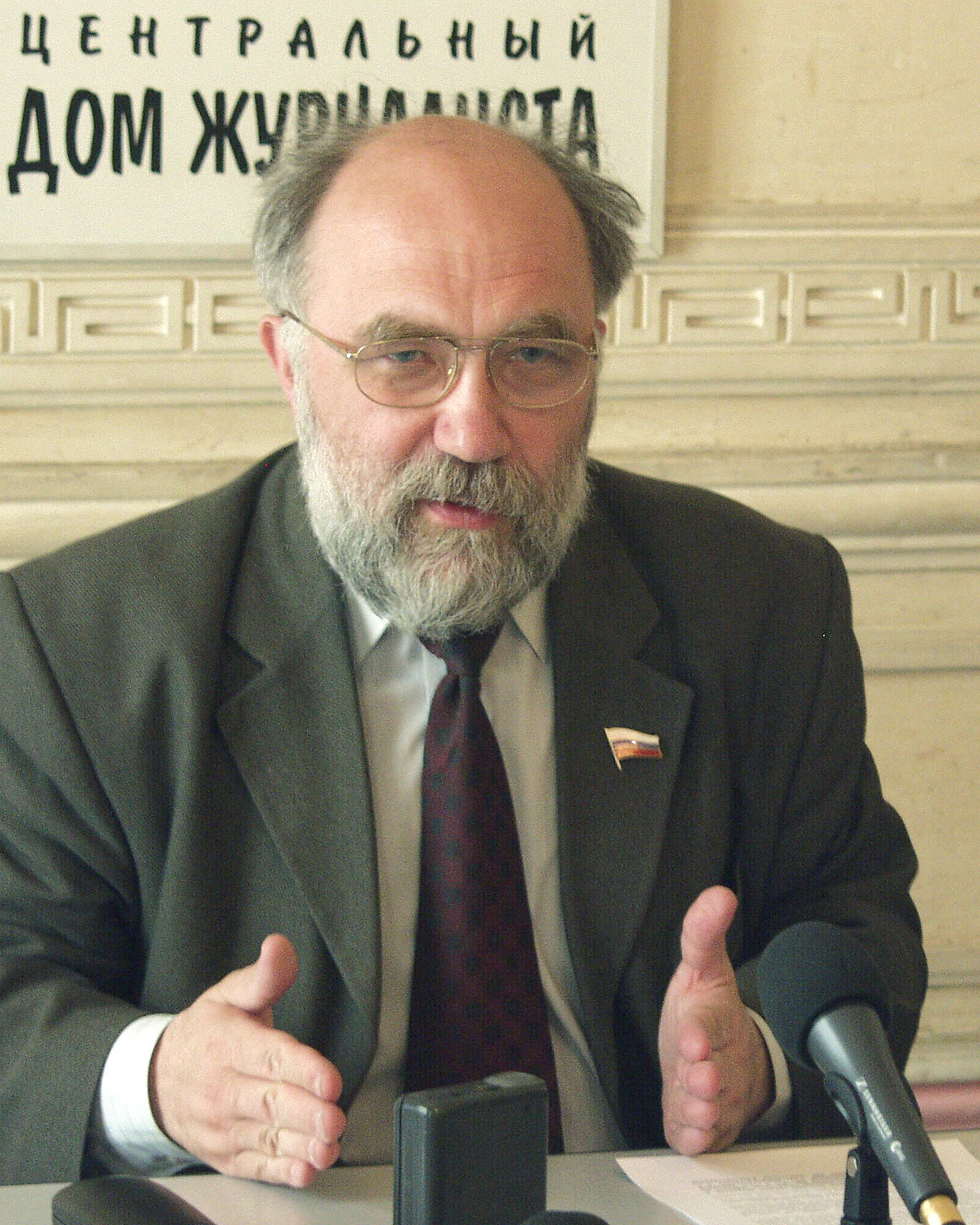
- Popov in May 2002

Member of the State Duma
- In office 1995–2007

Personal details
- Born: 15 May 1948 (age 78) Leningrad, Soviet Union
- Party: A Just Russia (since 2007)
- Other political affiliations: Yabloko
- Education: Leningrad State University

Sergey Alekseyevich Popov (Russian: Сергей Алексеевич Попов; born on 15 May 1948), is a Russian politician, who had been a member of parliament, a deputy of the State Duma of the second, third, and fourth convocations.

== Biography ==
Sergey Popov was born on 15 May 1948 in Leningrad.

=== Education and teaching ===
He graduated from the Faculty of Mathematics and Mechanics in 1971, and Faculty of Law of the A. A. Zhdanov Leningrad State University in 1993.

In 1974, he was an assistant, then senior lecturer at the Department of Higher Mathematics of the Leningrad Polytechnic Institute (now - Saint Petersburg State Technical University).

=== Start of political activity ===
From 1990 to 1993, he was a deputy of the Lensovet (St. Petersburg Council), and was the deputy chairman of the commission on upbringing and public education.

In 1993, he had been a member of the Regional Center Party (ROC; operated in St. Petersburg).

From 1993 to 1994, he was a senior lecturer at the Department of Higher Mathematics at St. Petersburg State Technical University.

In 1994, he has been a lawyer at the Saint Petersburg International Bar Association. The same year, Popov won two lawsuits that received significant media coverage: on the lawsuit of the Vice Mayor of Saint Petersburg Vyacheslav Shcherbakov against Mayor Anatoly Sobchak for illegal dismissal and on the lawsuit of a number of public organizations against the mayor about the illegal cancellation of the decision of the city election commission for elections to the Legislative city meeting in the spring of 1994.

He also participated in lawsuits “The labor collective of the Soyuzproektverf Institute against the Committee for the Management of City Property of St. Petersburg”, “Yabloko” against the Central Election Commission” (on invalidating the decision to refuse to register an electoral association).

From 1994 to 1995, he was an assistant to a deputy of the Federation Council of the first convocation, Yury Boldyrev.

In 1995, Popov was elected to the State Duma of the second convocation for the Southwestern District of St. Petersburg, and was nominated by the Yabloko party. He was a member of the Yabloko faction, and was a member of the Committee on Legislation and Judicial-Legal Reform.

He was a member of a special commission of the State Duma to assess compliance with procedural rules and the factual validity of the charges brought against Russian president Boris Yeltsin. He spoke with a dissenting opinion, believing that on two counts (in connection with the commission of actions that led to the weakening of the defense capability and security of Russia; in connection with the commission of actions that led to the genocide of the Russian people), bringing the president to criminal responsibility is contrary to the Criminal Code of Russia. And on one point (in connection with the events of September–October 1993 in Moscow), the question of whether the resolution adopted by the State Duma of 23 February 1994 “On declaring a political and economic amnesty” hinders the filing of charges.

In 1996, he was a Member of the executive committee of the Guild of Russian Lawyers. The same year, he won a lawsuit against the Central Bank of Russia on the allocation of funds from the territorial road fund to St. Petersburg.

In 1997, he was a member of the political council of the Regional Center Party Yabloko. Since the founding of the Yabloko party, he has been the chairman of its audit commission. He was the Deputy Chairman of the Yabloko party.

In 1999, Popov was re-elected to the State Duma in the same district, and was nominated by the Yabloko party. That time, he was the Deputy Chairman of the State Duma Committee on Constitutional Legislation and State Building. The same year, he was elected vice-president of the Saint Petersburg International Bar Association.

On 18 October 1999, Popov won in the court of the Central District of St. Petersburg the process against the Ministry of Finance of Russia. He demanded to declare illegal the actions of the Ministry of Finance on the execution of the federal budget of 1998. He managed to prove that due to the underfunding of a number of federal programs in St. Petersburg, his rights were violated, since the ministry did not allocate the funds approved in the budget for the restoration of the metro line, torn as a result of erosion, for the construction of flood protection structures in the Gulf of Finland, for the construction of the Hermitage storage fund and the new building of the Russian National Library.

In 2003, Popov was again elected to the State Duma of the fourth convocation in the same district, and was nominated by the Yabloko party, but was not included in the registered deputy associations. He was a member of the Committee on Constitutional Legislation and State Building.

==== Participation in the activities with A Just Russia ====
In 2007, Popov was nominated as a candidate for the State Duma from the A Just Russia party (number 1 on the list for the Lipetsk Oblast).

In 2016, Popov ran for deputies of the State Duma of the 7th convocation from the Just Russia party: he entered the federal list of the party (No. 7 in the regional group No. 50, St. Petersburg (took 5th place with 10.11% of the vote).
