= Krasnogvardeysky District, Saint Petersburg =

Krasnogvardeysky District Красногвардейский район (Russian)
- District
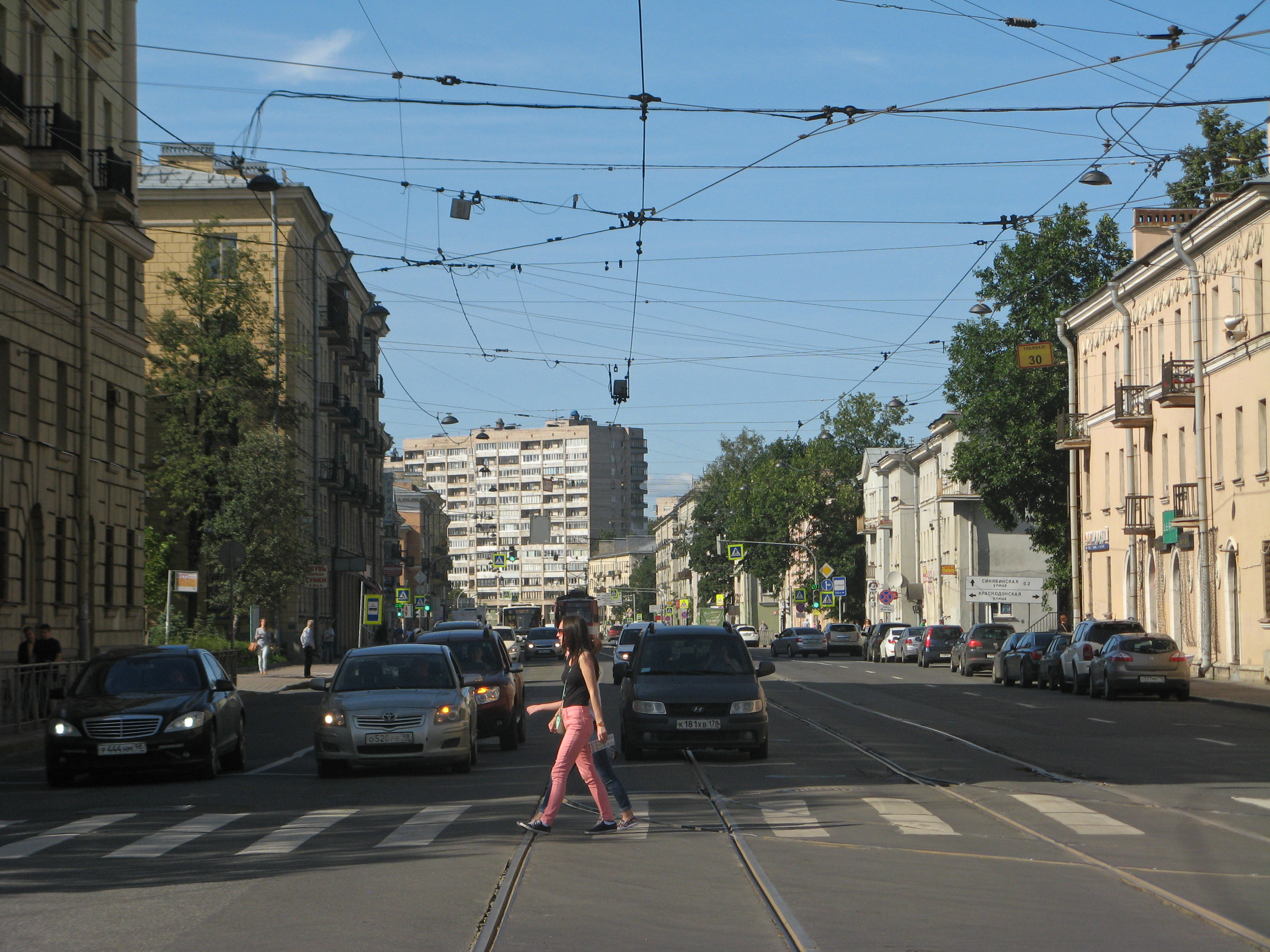
- Sredneokhtinsky Prospect, Krasnogvardeysky District
- Krasnogvardeysky District on the 2006 map of St. Petersburg
- Coordinates: 59°58′N 30°28′E
- Country: Russia
- Federal subject: federal city of St. Petersburg
- Established: 1973

Area
  - Total: 56.8 km^{2} (21.9 sq mi)

Population (2010 Census)
  - Total: 337,091
  - Density: 5,930/km^{2} (15,400/sq mi)
- Website: http://gov.spb.ru/gov/terr/krasnogvard/

Krasnogvardeysky District (Russian: Красногварде́йский райо́н) is a district of the federal city of St. Petersburg, Russia. As of the 2010 Census, its population was 337,091; up from 336,342 recorded in the 2002 Census. The population as of the 1989 Census was 377,765.

== Municipal divisions ==
Krasnogvardeysky District comprises the following five municipal okrugs:

- Bolshaya Okhta
- Malaya Okhta
- Polyustrovo
- Porokhovye
- Rzhevka
