= Slavianism =

Slavianism or Slavism (Russian: Славянство, romanized: Slavyanstvo) is a general term for Slavic culture, civilization and identity. It may refer to:

- Slavs, an Indo-European ethno-linguistic group
- Pan-Slavism, a political ideology
- Slavic culture, various cultures of Slavic Europe
- Slavic nationalism (disambiguation), various forms of nationalism
- Slavic Native Faith, a modern Pagan religion

== See also ==
- Slavic (disambiguation)
- Slavia (disambiguation)
- Slavyansk (disambiguation)
- Slavyansky (disambiguation)
