= Yale University International Chorus =

American vocal group

Yale University International Chorus: Diplomats of Song
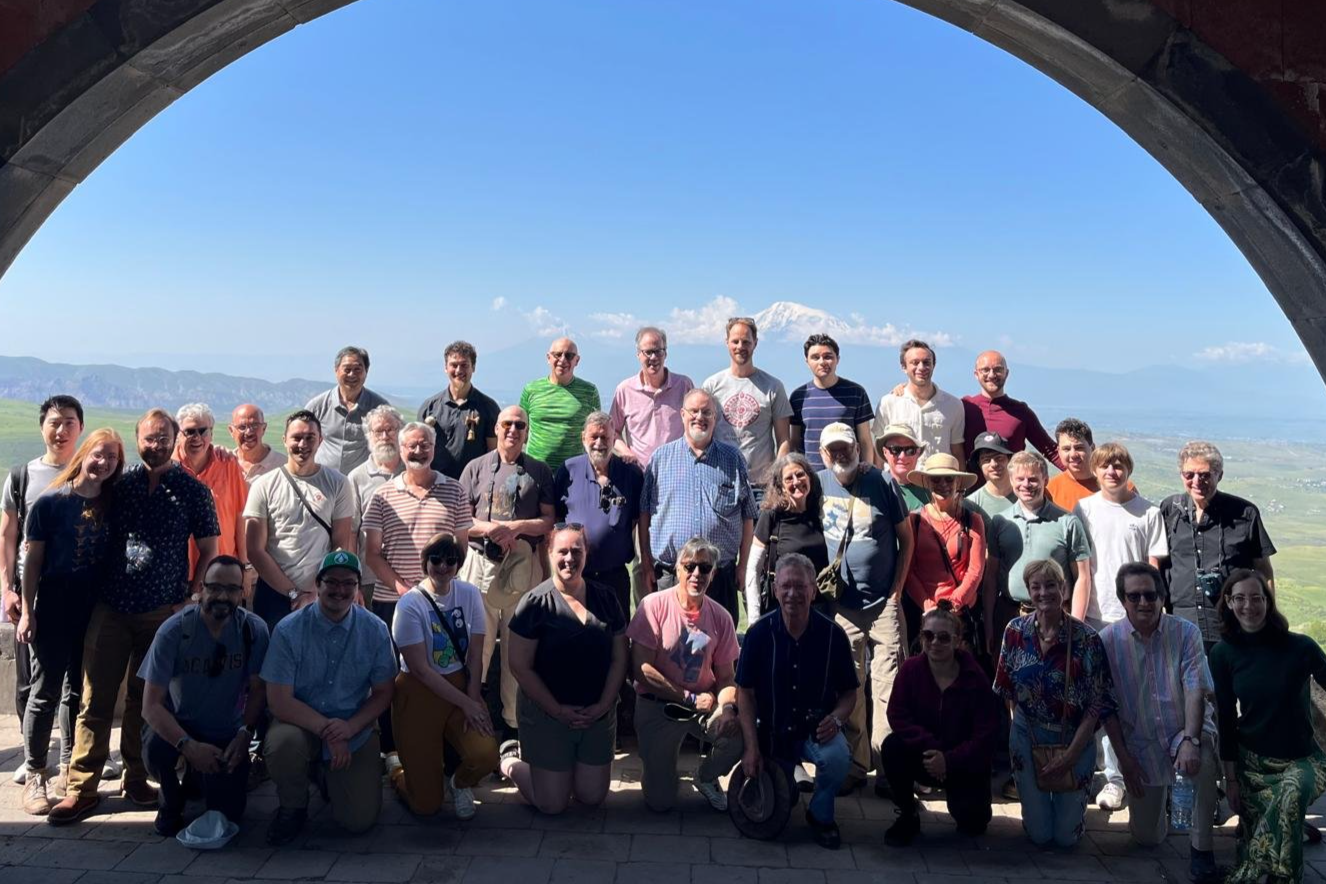
- Yale University International Chorus members at an overlook during the group’s 2025 tour to Georgia and Armenia. Mount Ararat is in the background.

Background information
- Origin: Yale University
- Genres: Choral
- Years active: 2025–present
- Members: Steven Lipsitt, Conductor

The Yale University International Chorus is an American vocal group that engages in international cultural exchange and citizen diplomacy through music. The YUIC is a TTBB ensemble composed of Yale University students, alumni, friends, and family. It was established in 2025 and held its inaugural tour in Georgia and Armenia that year. Every concert includes music of the host country, American music, and selected music from other countries; its repertoire is primarily focused on the musical traditions of Eastern Europe. The YUIC is organized and sponsored by the Yale Russian Chorus Alumni Association.

== Background ==
The nucleus of the YUIC is formed from current and former members of the Yale Russian Chorus, a TTBB ensemble which was founded in 1953 by Latvian conductor Denis Mickiewicz. The Yale Russian Chorus was the first American performance group to tour in the Soviet Union on private initiative in 1958. Then-senator Hubert Humphrey described the group as the "Diplomats of Song", in recognition of their contribution to international relations.

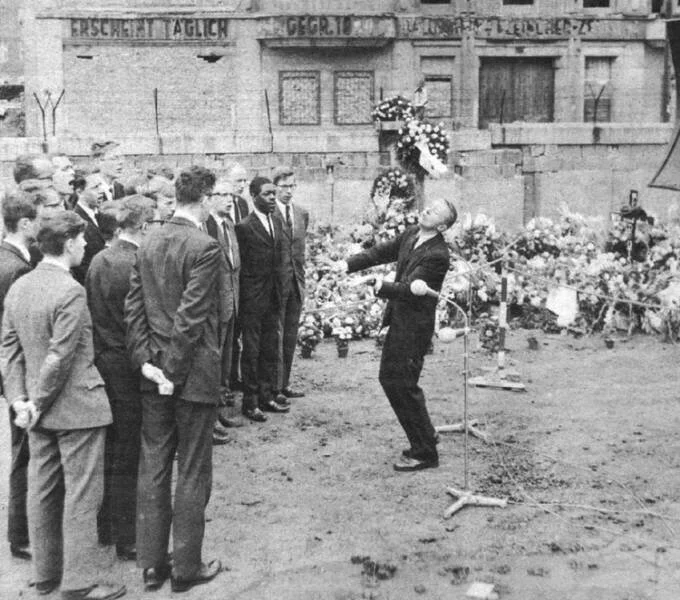
In August of 1962, members of the Yale Russian Chorus sang a memorial in front of the Berlin wall for Peter Fechter, who was killed attempting to cross the wall.

The Yale Russian Chorus toured a total of 12 times in the Soviet Union, performing in the Soviet republics of Russia, Ukraine, the Baltic States, and in the Caucasus. Their repertoire consisted of traditional (typically pre-Soviet) secular and liturgical music of Russia and other republics as well as some American folk ballads. The group also toured in other countries of the Soviet Bloc, including Poland and East Germany. They have additionally performed in West Germany, France, England, and Wales, as well as across the United States. After the fall of the Soviet Union the group continued to visit the former Soviet republics, including a 2019 tour to Russia, with a view to continuing cultural understanding between east and west.

In 2025 a group of alumni, current students, friends, and family, organized an international tour of the Caucasus. In recognition of the changing geopolitical environment brought about by the Russian invasion of Ukraine, the group toured under the name Yale University International Chorus. The name was chosen to emphasize its expanding repertoire, international community, and mission of building bridges through music. Russian-language music, while still in the repertoire, does not currently play a role in the YUIC's performances.

== Tours ==
In Summer 2025 the YUIC embarked on a two-week tour of Georgia and Armenia. The chorus performed in locations such as the National Library of Georgia, the Armenian Genocide Museum, and the Haghpat Monastery. During the tour the chorus sang with the Rustavi Ensemble, a Georgian ensemble formed in 1968. This collaboration was the continuation of a long-term relationship originally established between Rustavi and members of the Yale Russian Chorus. The YUIC also collaborate with the Armenian Saghmosergu Men's Chorus for Spiritual Music.

The Caucasus tour was organized in collaboration with John Graham, a noted ethnomusicologist and tour operator. It was additionally supported by members of the Kartuli ensemble, an American choral group and YRC offshoot focused on Georgian music.

The YUIC is preparing a 2027 summer tour of Lithuania, Latvia, and Estonia. In preparation for this the group published a songbook of repertoire, including music from the Baltic region, American traditional music, and music from the Caucasus tour. The Baltic tour repertoire was developed with input from experts in music of the Baltic region, including the Chicago-based Lithuanian choral ensemble Dainava, and Cantus.
