= Slavyanka, Russia =

Slavyanka (Russian: Славя́нка) is the name of several inhabited localities in Russia.

Urban localities

- Slavyanka, Primorsky Krai, an urban-type settlement in Khasansky District of Primorsky Krai

Rural localities

- Slavyanka, Belgorod Oblast, a khutor in Chernyansky District of Belgorod Oblast
- Slavyanka, Khabarovsk Krai, a selo in Nanaysky District of Khabarovsk Krai
- Slavyanka, Kirovsky District, Leningrad Oblast, a village under the administrative jurisdiction of Mginskoye Settlement Municipal Formation, Kirovsky District of Leningrad Oblast
- Slavyanka, Luzhsky District, Leningrad Oblast, a village in Osminskoye Settlement Municipal Formation of Luzhsky District of Leningrad Oblast
- Slavyanka, Priozersky District, Leningrad Oblast, a logging depot settlement in Gromovskoye Settlement Municipal Formation of Priozersky District of Leningrad Oblast
- Slavyanka, Novosibirsk Oblast, a selo in Bagansky District of Novosibirsk Oblast
- Slavyanka, Novovarshavsky District, Omsk Oblast, a selo in Slavyansky Rural Okrug of Novovarshavsky District of Omsk Oblast
- Slavyanka, Sherbakulsky District, Omsk Oblast, a village in Slavyansky Rural Okrug of Sherbakulsky District of Omsk Oblast
- Slavyanka, Orenburg Oblast, a khutor in Raznomoysky Selsoviet of Tyulgansky District of Orenburg Oblast
- Slavyanka, Saratov Oblast, a settlement in Voskresensky District of Saratov Oblast
- Slavyanka, Kirillovsky District, Vologda Oblast, a village in Nikolo-Torzhsky Selsoviet of Kirillovsky District of Vologda Oblast
- Slavyanka, Mezhdurechensky District, Vologda Oblast, a village in Botanovsky Selsoviet of Mezhdurechensky District of Vologda Oblast
- Slavyanka, Sheksninsky District, Vologda Oblast, a village in Lyubomirovsky Selsoviet of Sheksninsky District of Vologda Oblast
- Slavyanka, Voronezh Oblast, a khutor in Yevstratovskoye Rural Settlement of Rossoshansky District of Voronezh Oblast
