= Slavyansky =

Slavyansky (masculine), Slavyanskaya (feminine), or Slavyanskoye (neuter) may refer to:

== People ==
- Fyodor Slavyansky (1817–1876), Russian painter

== Places ==
- Slavyansky District, a district of Krasnodar Krai, Russia
- Slavyanskoye Urban Settlement, several municipal urban settlements in Russia
- Slavyansky (rural locality) (Slavyanskoye, Slavyanskaya), several rural localities in Russia
- Slavyansky District, alternative name of Sloviansk Raion, Ukraine
- Slavyanskaya Square, Moscow
- Slavyansky Bulvar, Moscow Metro station, Moscow, Russia

== Other uses ==
- FC Slavyansky Slavyansk-na-Kubani, an association football club from Russia
- Slavyansky Bazaar, event in Belarus

== See also ==
- Slavic (disambiguation)
- Slavyansk (disambiguation)
- Slavyanka (disambiguation)
