= Slavyanka =

Slavyanka may refer to:

- Slavyanka (mountain), a mountain in Bulgaria and Greece
- Slavyanka, Azerbaijan, a village in Gadabay Rayon of Azerbaijan
- Slavyanka, Russia, name of several inhabited localities in Russia
- Slavyanka (river), a tributary of the Neva in Leningrad Oblast, Russia
- Slavyanka, Saskatchewan, a defunct Doukhobor village near Blaine Lake, Saskatchewan, Canada
- Slavyanka, alternative name of the Russian River in California, United States
- Slavianka (clothing), a Belarusian firm
- Slavyanka Beach, a geographic feature in Antarctica
- Slavyanka (a cappella group), a vocal group based in San Francisco

== See also ==
- Farewell of Slavianka, a Russian march
- Petro-Slavyanka, a municipal settlement in Kolpinsky District of Saint Petersburg, Russia
