= Gregory Smirnov =

Russian-American choir director

- Григорий Смирнов
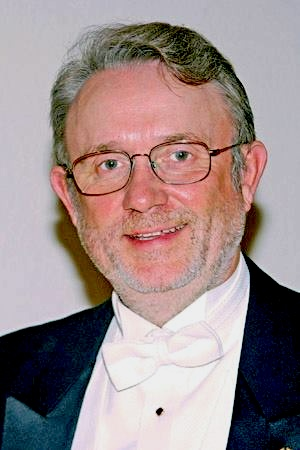
- Born: March 16, 1949 (age 77); Pskov, RSFSR, Soviet Union
- Citizenship: Russia (birthplace), United States (naturalized in 1999)
- Occupations: Choral director, composer, music instructor

Gregory Anatolyevich Smirnov (Russian: Григорий Анатольевич Смирнов; 16 March 1949) is a Russian-born choral director, composer, and music instructor based in the San Francisco Bay Area. He served as the director of the Slavyanka chorus from 1996 to 2011.

== Biography ==
Gregory was born in Pskov in 1949. He was 13 years old when he first began taking piano lessons. He attended the Pskov College of Music and received a Bachelor of Fine Arts in 1970, then a Master of Fine Arts in Music from the Saratov Conservatory. At the conservatory, his specializations included choir conducting, voice coaching, and music education. In Pskov, he directed several choirs and ran the music department at the Pskov Drama Theater. He also worked as a teacher at the Pskov College of Music for ten years. Before emigrating from Russia, he was the founder and conductor of the Pskov Chamber Choir, which gave an award-winning performance at the Festival of Russian Choirs in 1992.

In 1991, the San Luis Obispo Vocal Arts Ensemble planned a trip to perform in Russia, and group members Rich and Mary Ferguson were invited to stay with Gregory and his wife Ludmilla in Pskov. As a result of this visit, Gregory was invited by director Gary Lamprecht to guest conduct the ensemble for a Christmas concert. In 1992, Gregory and his wife made the decision to immigrate to the United States. After arriving in New York, he found a job as the choir director of a Russian Orthodox Church in Menlo Park, California. As a faithful Orthodox Christian, he was grateful for the opportunity to perform sacred Russian music that was previously repressed in the Soviet Union. He became a US citizen in 1999.

In 1996, Gregory was hired as the choral director of the Slavyanka chorus, a position that he retained until 2011. His work included arranging, editing, and transcribing a variety of secular and sacred choral music for the choir. In 1998, Slavyanka performed his arrangement of Alfred Schnittke's "Jesus Prayer" in the film What Dreams May Come. His arrangements are included on several Slavyanka recordings, including the 2000 album "Song of the Volga Boatmen".

Gregory has uncovered and performed a number of rare choral works that were hidden from authorities during Soviet times, including ones by Tchaikovsky, Rachmaninoff, and Gretchaninov. In 1993, he conducted a Tchaikovsky rendition of the Cherubic Hymn with the San Luis Obispo Vocal Arts Ensemble that he had discovered on hand-written sheets in a private Russian library.

== See also ==
- Slavyanka (a cappella group)
