= Slavyansk =

Slavyansk may refer to:

- The Russian-language name of Sloviansk, a city in Donetsk Oblast, Ukraine
- Slavyansk-on-Kuban, a town in Krasnodar Krai, Russia

== See also ==
- Nikopol, Ukraine, a town in Dnipropetrovsk Oblast, Ukraine; known as Slovianske in 1779–1782
- Slavic (disambiguation)
- Slavyansky (disambiguation)
- Slavyanka (disambiguation)
