= Leonid Yanush =

Russian painter (1897–1978)

Leonid Borisovich Yanush
- Born: 13 December 1897; Saint Petersburg
- Died: 8 June 1978 (aged 80); Leningrad
- Education: Fine Arts reward school, Saint Petersburg Institute of Technology
- Known for: Landscape, Genre painting, railroads
- Movement: Realism

Leonid Borisovich Yanush (Russian: Леонид Борисович Януш; 13 December 1897 – 8 June 1978) was a painter from Leningrad, a representative of classic Russian landscapers.

«I think that every man who considers himself well-bred and cultural has to be involved in some kind of art or at least be interested in arts» — L. B. Yanush, painter, scientist, tutor.

== Biography ==
=== Early life ===
Leonid was born on 13 December 1897 in Saint-Petersburg. As a child he was influenced by his grandfather General Leonid Ivanovich Yanush, who gave his grandson his first lessons in painting.

In 1912, Leonid's family moved to Pavlovsk. The boy started to study painting in a fine arts reward school. His teacher was N. Khimona (student of famous Arkhip Kuindzhi). Khimona was a representative of Russian traditional landscape school and much influenced young painter.

In 1915, Leonid graduated from the National Defense Cadet corps and entered Saint-Petersburg State Architectural University. Soon after, he was called to arms because the start of the First World War.

=== Career ===
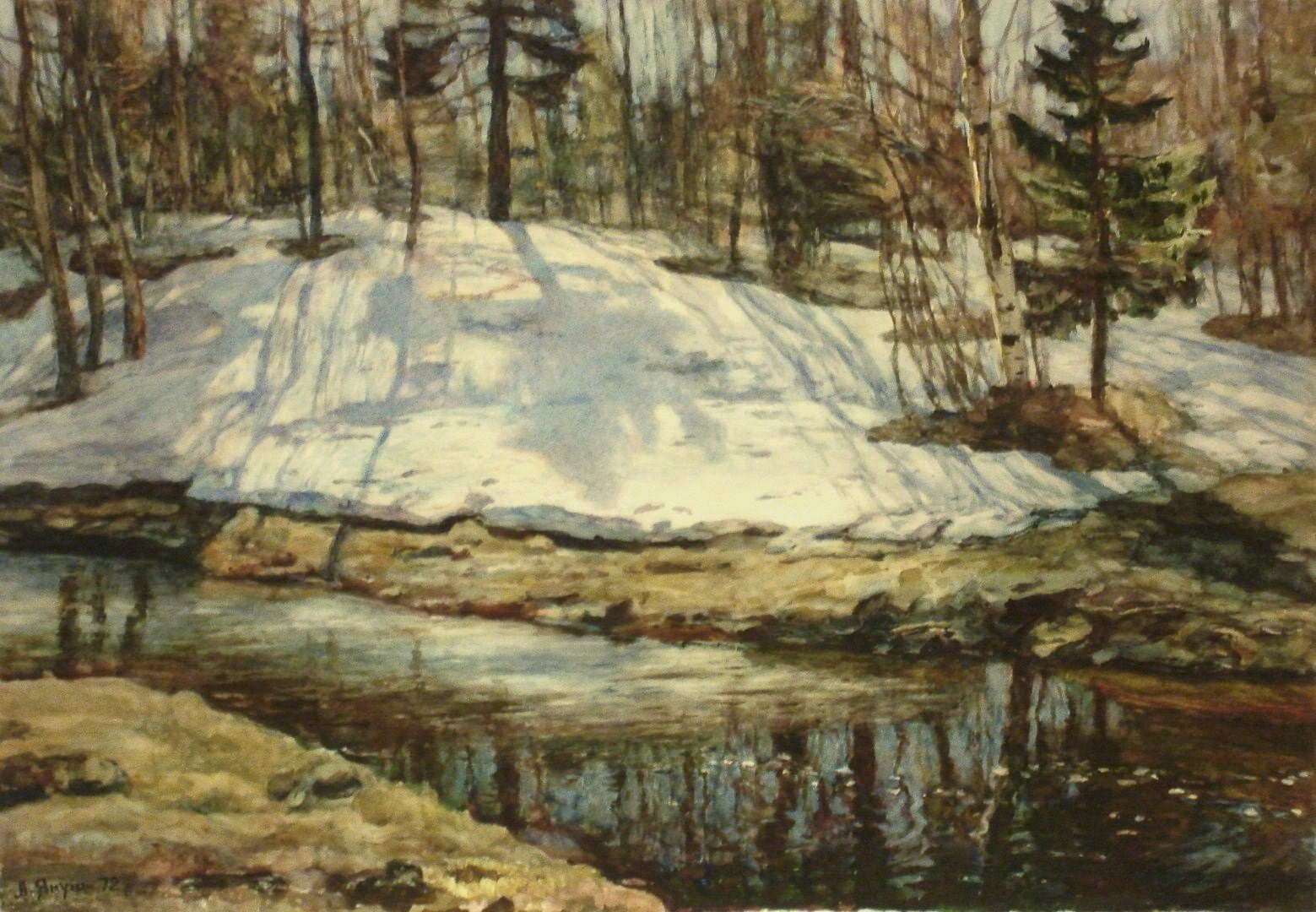
«Black river» (1972)

Leonid dreamed of entering Saint-Petersburg Academy of Fine Arts. However, when his grandfather and father died in 1918, Leonid became the master of the family. He decided to devote himself to his second passion: railroads. He started working as a technician and soon became the machinist of a steam locomotive. During the Civil War in Russia, Leonid drove civil and military trains.

After coming back to Pavlovsk, Leonid continued his studies at the Saint Petersburg Institute of Technology. In 1923, he married Ekaterina Lazarevna Bryzgacheva; after a year she gave birth to a daughter, Natasha. In 1927, the family moved to Petrograd where Leonid started his scientific and tutorial work. He taught courses on locomotive construction. He wrote several books under category of steam locomotive construction, which were published between 1929 and 1935. Several generations of engineers studied these books. In those days, Leonid Yanush painted less but created many sketches. During that time, he created a set of railroad paintings. Some of them are now in the Railroad museum in Saint-Petersburg.

In 1935, during the initial years of the Great Purge, scientific intellectuals were persecuted by the government. Leonid Yanush was fired from the Institute and struggled to find consistent work for a period. He returned to painting and started studies in Fine arts school. There he met Arkady Rylov, who became his tutor.

Before the German invasion of the Soviet Union, Leonid started working in the Military Transport Academy. At the end of 1941, the academy was evacuated to Kostroma, where he spent much time painting. Leonid walked for many kilometers and created many beautiful sketches of the old city and its suburbs. Beyond painting, he continued his science work and received his Kandidat of Science degree in 1942.

At the end of 1944, the academy moved back to Leningrad where Leonid Borisovich Yanush continued to work. In 1947, he invented a new construction of a steam mechanism, but his invention soon lost his actuality because of the popularity of electricity. In 1950, he wrote the bookRussian steam locomotives for 50 years. In total, during his work in Military Transport Academy, he wrote more than 30 books, manuals and handbooks. He also succeeded at painting, participating every year in the Leningrad Associate of painters' exhibitions.

=== Later career ===
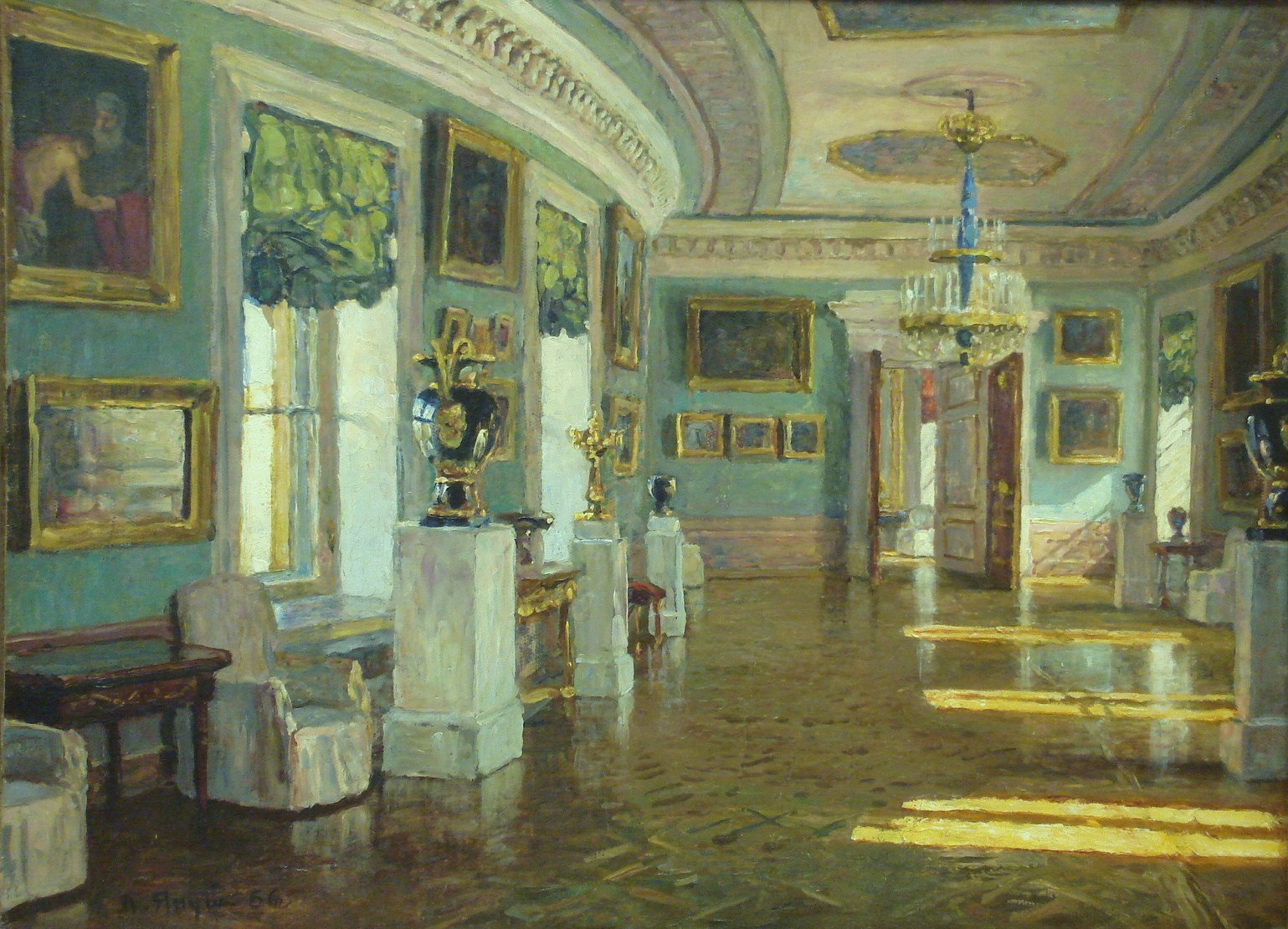
«Pavlovsk» (1966)

In 1962, Leonid Borisovich became acquainted with Pavlovsk Palace director Anna Ivanovna Zelenova. He created the portrait of this brave woman who had saved many precious palace's and park's masterpieces during the war. At her permission, he created a set of paintings of palace's interiors, architectural ensembles and landscapes of a few parks in the world.

During the 1970s, he created a famous aquarelle set of Saint-Petersburg House of stage veterans interiors. In the years of painter's 75th and 80th anniversaries, his personal exhibitions were held in Leningrad. They were highly admired by Russian traditional painting lovers.

Leonid Borisovich died on 8 June 1978. He is buried in Pavlovsk near the graves of his father and grandfather. His wife and daughter are buried there as well.

== Works ==
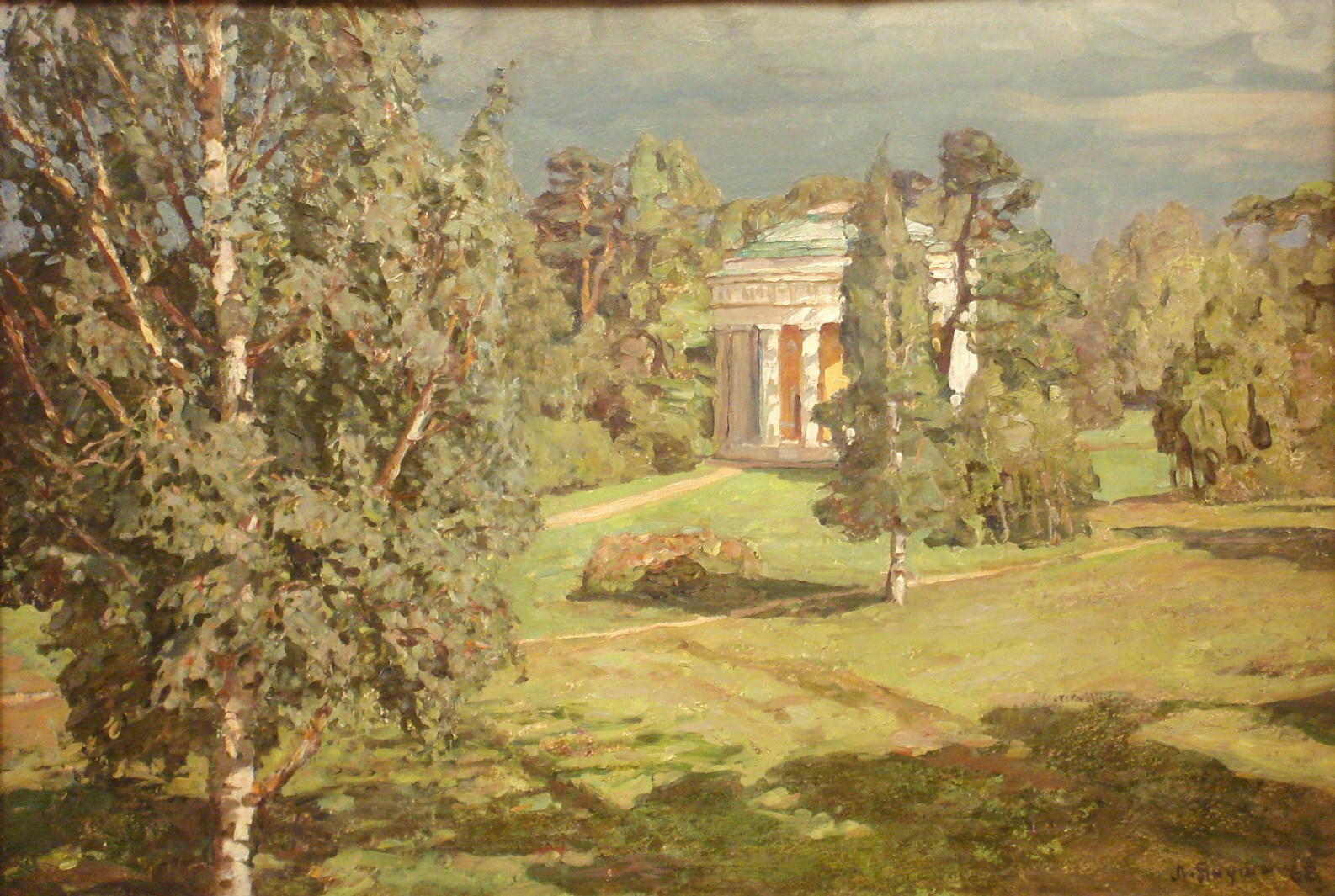
«Pavlovsk. Temple of Friendship» (1968)

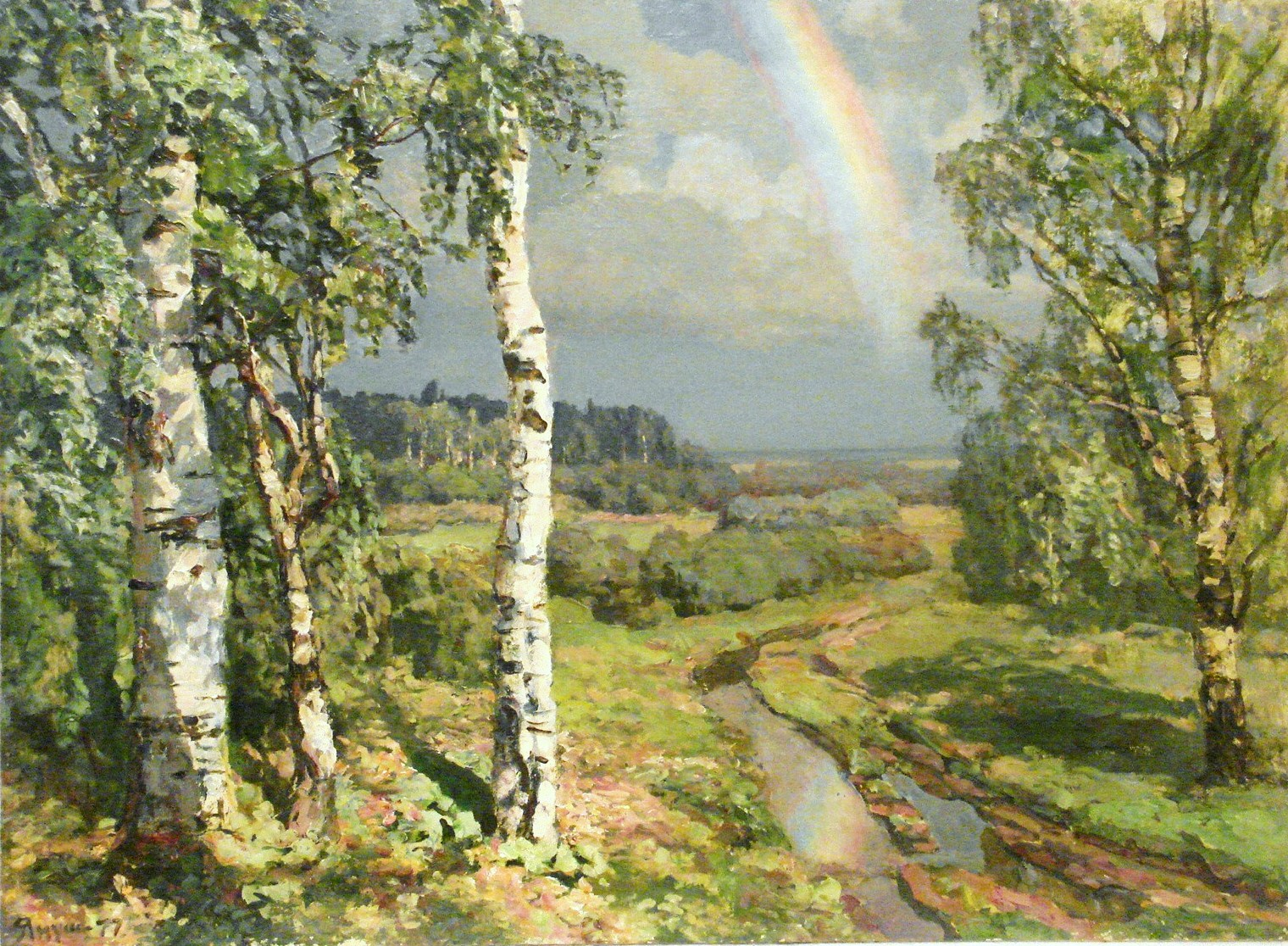
«Thunderstorm is gone» (1977)

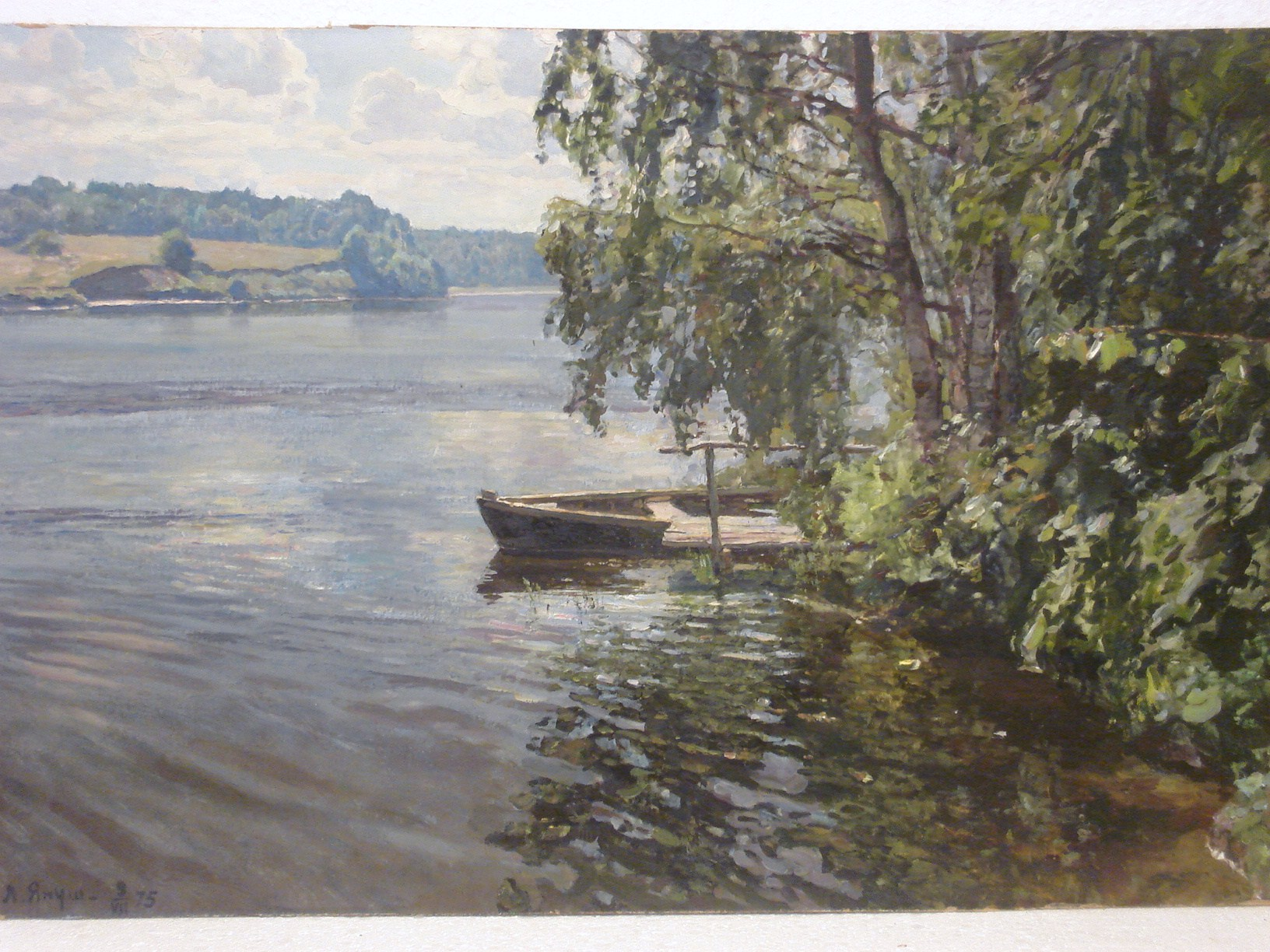
«River Mga» (1975)

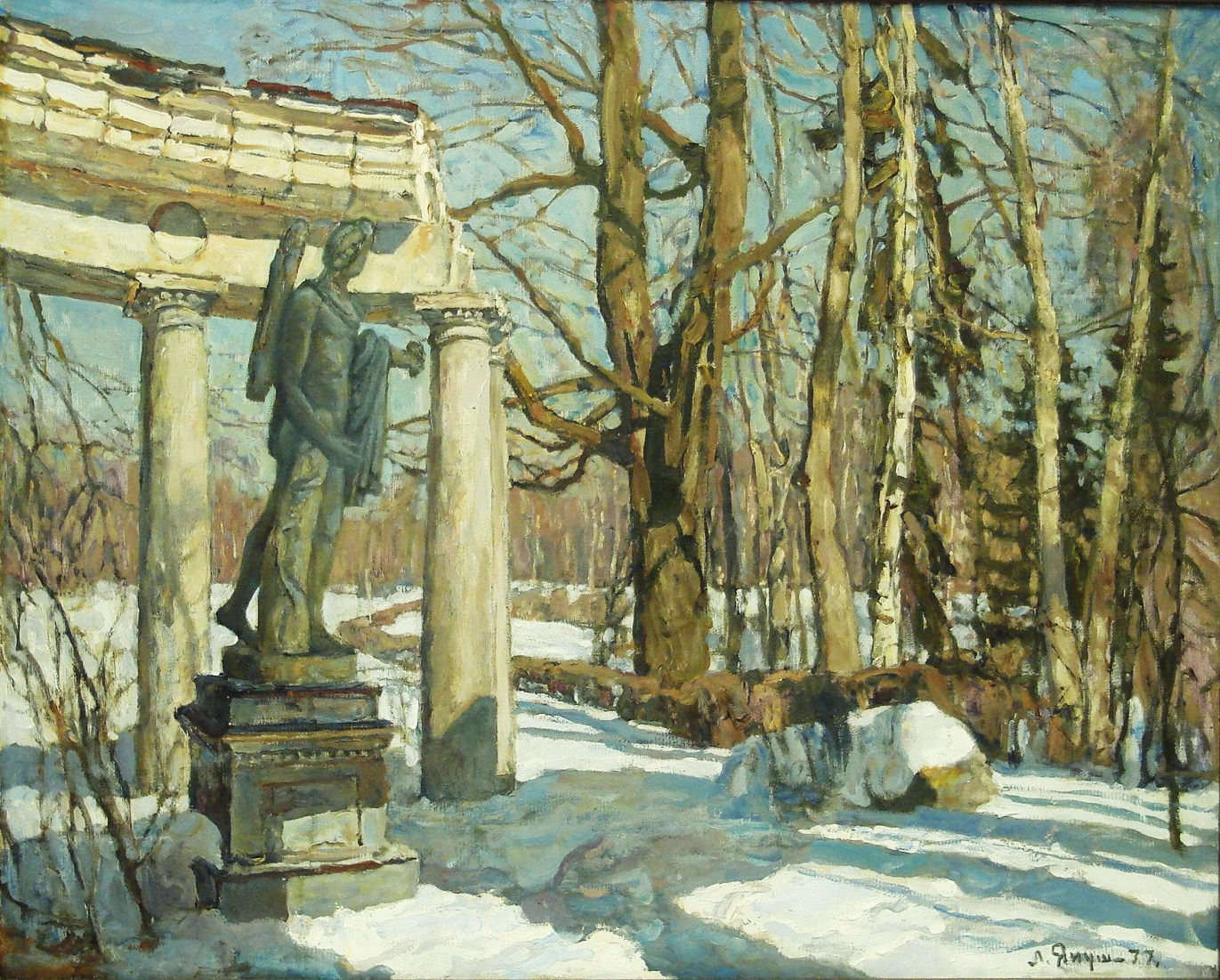
«Pavlovsk is 200 years old» (1977)
