= Slavyanskoye Urban Settlement =

Slavyanskoye Urban Settlement is the name of several municipal formations in Russia.

- Slavyanskoye Urban Settlement, a municipal formation within Slavyansky Municipal District which the Town of Slavyansk-na-Kubani in Krasnodar Krai is incorporated as
- Slavyanskoye Urban Settlement, a municipal formation which the urban-type settlement of Slavyanka and six rural localities in Khasansky District of Primorsky Krai are incorporated as

== See also ==
- Slavyansky (disambiguation)
