= Pavlovsk, Saint Petersburg =

Municipal town in Pushkinsky District, Saint Petersburg, Russia

Pavlovsk Павловск
- Municipal town
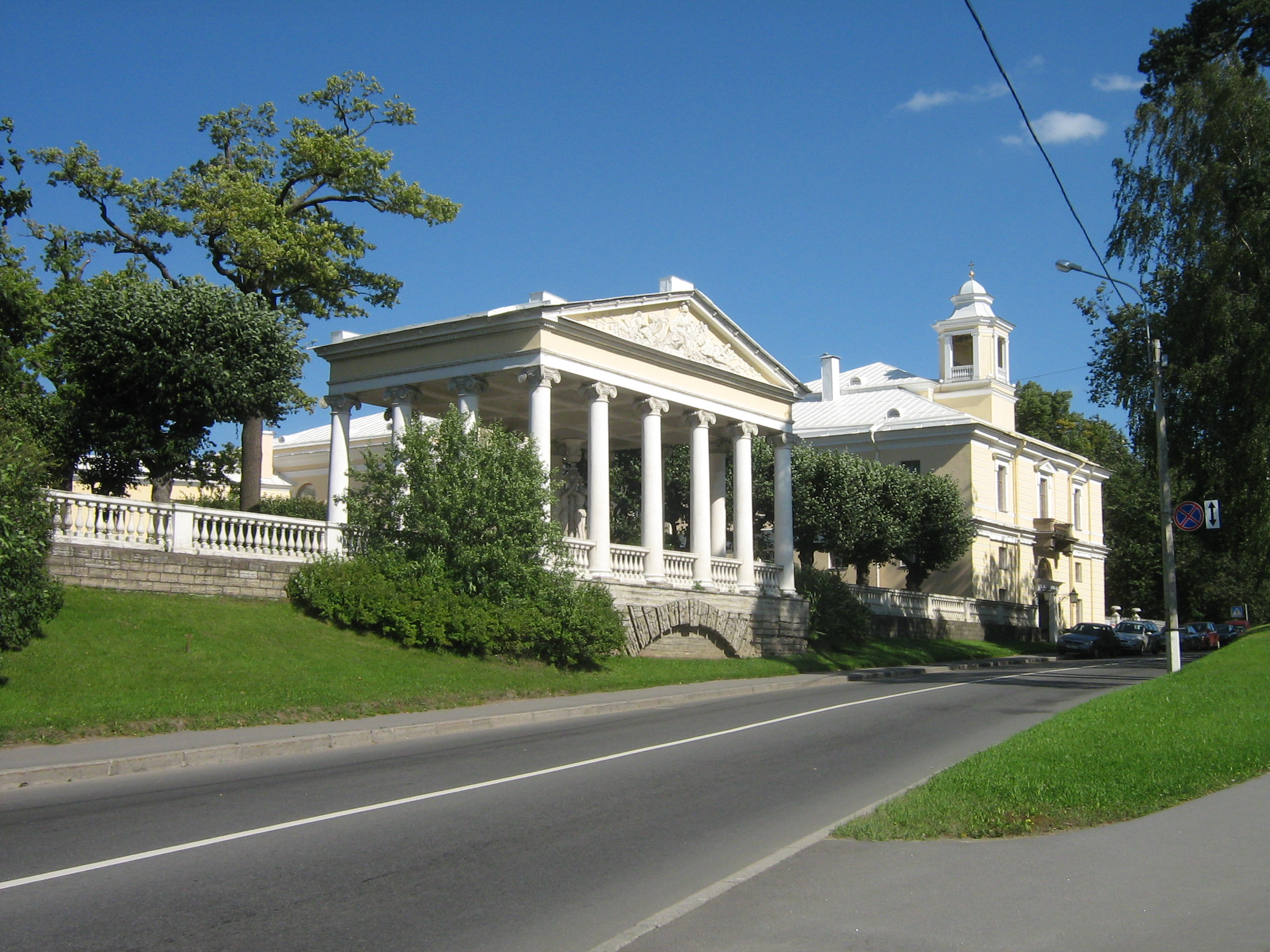
- Entrance to the park with pavilion "Three Graces"

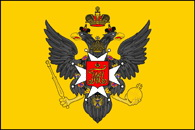
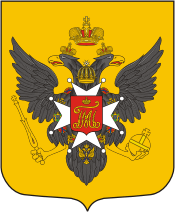
- Flag Coat of arms

- Location of Pavlovsk in Saint Petersburg
- Interactive map of Pavlovsk
- Location of Pavlovsk Pavlovsk (Saint Petersburg)
- Coordinates: 59°41′N 30°27′E
- Country: Russia
- Federal subject: Saint Petersburg
- Founded: 1777

Area
  - Total: 36.78 km^{2} (14.20 sq mi)

Population (2010 Census)
  - Total: 16,087
  - Estimate (2023): 17,775 (+10.5%)
  - Density: 437.4/km^{2} (1,133/sq mi)
- Time zone: UTC+
- Dialing code: +7 +7 812
- OKTMO ID: 40387000
- Website: mo-pavlovsk.ru

Pavlovsk (Russian: Па́вловск "[the town] of Pavel" after Emperor Pavel (Paul) of Russia) is a municipal town in Pushkinsky District in the suburban part of the federal city of Saint Petersburg, Russia, located 30 kilometers (19 mi) south from Saint Petersburg proper and about 4 kilometers (2.5 mi) southeast from Pushkin. Population: 16,087 (2010 census). Known since the late 18th century, when Saint Petersburg was the capital of Russian Empire, as a countryside residence of Russian royal family commissioned creation of the town's landmark -palace with a large park, now parts of its federal museum reserve.

The town developed around the Pavlovsk Palace, a major residence of the Russian imperial family. Between 1918 and 1944, its official name was Slutsk, after the revolutionary Vera Slutskaya, and then was changed back to Pavlovsk. Pavlovsk is part of the UNESCO World Heritage Site "Historic Centre of Saint Petersburg and Related Groups of Monuments".

== History ==
=== Fortress ===
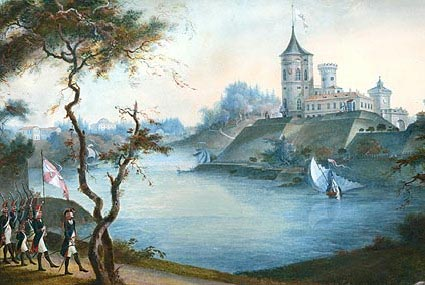
Bip fortress in the early 19th century

A wooden fortress was built by Russians on the place of Pavlovsk and was known from at least 13th century as part of an Administrative division of Novgorod Land. The fortress and the entire region were later captured by the Swedes. On 13 August 1702, the Russian army led by Peter the Great and Fyodor Apraksin met Swedes at the Izhora river and pushed them to the fortress. For several days, the Swedish Army was reinforcing their positions but were expelled upon a surprise frontal attack.

Paul I, an avid fan of the military, had long dreamed of building a stone fortress on the ruins of the Swedish forts. After he became an emperor, in 1796, he hired the Italian architect Vincenzo Brenna and raised money for the project. By 1798 Brenna raised a Gothic folly, Bip fortress, which fascinated Paul so much that he listed it on the Army register of real fortresses. After the death of Catherine, Paul and Brenna expanded the Pavlovsk estate with real military barracks, officers' quarters and a hospital.

=== Imperial residence ===
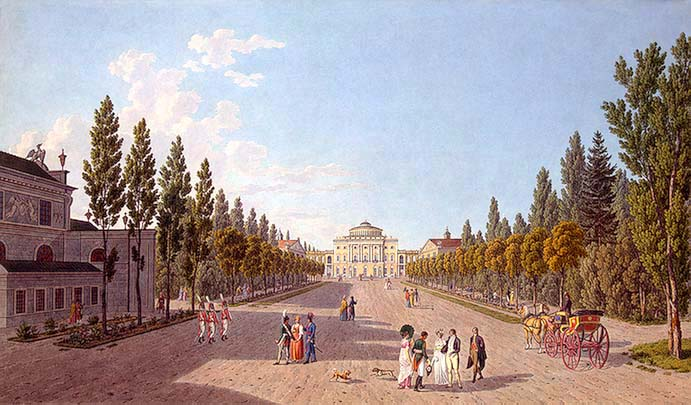
View of the palace and park in 1808

Catherine the Great liked the nature in Pavlovsk area and frequently visited it for hunting trips. In December 1777, she assigned to her son, Paul I, 362 desyatinas (977 acres; 395 ha) of land along the Slavyanka river, together with forests, arable land and two small villages with peasants. This was a present to Paul and his wife Maria Feodorovna on the occasion of the birth of their first son, the future Emperor Alexander I of Russia. This date is considered the founding date of the Pavlovskoye village (the name Pavlovsk derives from Paul's name in Russian, Pavel). Catherine commissioned the Scottish architect Charles Cameron, who had previously done much work for her in the nearby Tsarskoye Selo, to design a palace and a park in Pavlovskoye.

Between 1782 and 1786 Cameron built the original palace core that survives to date, the Temple of Friendship, Private Gardens, Aviary, Apollo Colonnade and the Lime Avenue. He also planned the original landscape including the huge English park with numerous temples, colonnades, bridges, and statues. The Temple of Friendship was the first building in Pavlovsk, followed by the main palace. However, Cameron's Pavlovsk was far from Paul's vision of what an imperial residence should be: it lacked moats, forts and all other military assortments so dear to Paul; "Cameron created a markedly private world for the Grand Duke. The palace could have belonged to anyone. not to the tsar of Russia in waiting." Constrained financially, Paul and Maria closely watched Cameron's progress and regularly curbed his far-reaching, expensive plans. Between 1786 and 1789 Cameron's duties in Pavlovsk passed to Brenna.

Paul personally hired Brenna, then employed by Stanisław Kostka Potocki, in 1782, and used him in 1783–1785 to visualize his architectural fantasies. Brenna left Cameron's palace core intact, extending it with side wings; although he remodeled the interiors, they bear traces of Cameron's style to date. However, Maria's private suite and the militaria displayed in public halls are attributed to Brenna alone.

In 1794, the population of Pavlovskoye counted 300 people, mostly peasants and palace servants. There was a stone church, a free public school for peasants and three hospitals: regular, military and for invalids. Later, an agriculture school and the first in Russia school for the deaf were established in Pavlovskoye. Between 1807 and 1810, the school for the deaf was located in the Bip fortress. Later, a military regiment was stationed and practiced there. Theatrical performances were regularly staged first in the palace and since 1794 in the theater built nearby by Brenna.

Pavel favored as his residence Gatchina to Pavlovskoye, and therefore, since 1788 the latter was managed by his wife who had contributed most to its well-being. Maria Feodorovna enjoyed animal husbandry (she used to milk cows herself) and thus built a large farm at the edge of the park and a wooden pavilion for studies. She was also a skilled artist, a member of Berlin Academy of Arts, and her numerous handicrafts still remain in the palace. A large collection of books was accumulated in the palace by her efforts. In 1796, the village received a status of a town and renamed to Pavlovsk.

=== After Paul I ===
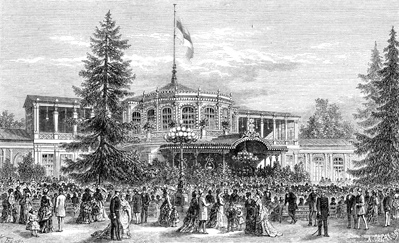
Pavlovsk train terminal, 19th century

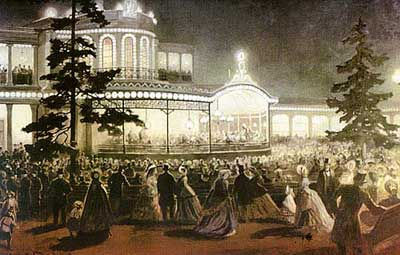
Ball in Pavlovsk on the 25th anniversary of the Tsarskoye Selo Railway

After Paul's death in 1801 the palace was proclaimed a residence of his widow, Maria Feodorovna. During that time, it was frequently visited by famous poets and novelists including Sergey Glinka, Nikolay Karamzin and Ivan Krylov. Vasily Zhukovsky was a regular reader for Maria Feodorovna and the teacher of Russian language and literature for Princess Charlotte of Württemberg, the wife of Grand Duke Michael Pavlovich of Russia who inherited Pavlovsk after the death of Maria Feodorovna in 1828. Michael Pavlovich spent his childhood in Pavlovsk, and then cared much about the city. Being a military person, he mostly improved well-being of the military corps staged near Pavlovsk and built barracks, riding stables, forge and workshops. But he also improved the roads of Pavlovsk, donated significant amounts to the church and established an orphanage and a school for middle-class children.

In the 19th century, Pavlovsk became a favorite summer retreat for well-to-do inhabitants of the Russian capital. The life of Pavlovsk's dachniki was described by Fyodor Dostoyevsky, who frequently visited the town, in his novel The Idiot. To facilitate transportation, the first railway in Russia, the Tsarskoye Selo Railway, was built around 1836. The first test runs were performed between Pavlovsk and Tsarskoye Selo using carriages horse-drawn over the rails. Regular trains powered by steam locomotives began operating between Pavlovsk and St. Petersburg from May 1838. Aiming to promote the railway, the Pavlovsk terminus was built in 1836–1838 as an entertainment center. It regularly hosted evening festivities, and Johann Strauss II (1856), Franz Liszt, Robert Schumann and Feodor Chaliapin were among the celebrities who performed there. The station was called 'Vauxhall Pavilion', and its fame eventually caused the word "voksal" (воксал) to enter the Russian language, with the meaning "substantial railway station building".

Michael Pavlovich died in 1849 leaving no heir, and thus Pavlovsk became property of a son of Nicholas I, Grand Duke Konstantin Nikolayevich of Russia. Konstantin Nikolayevich established in 1872 an art gallery and a museum in the palace and opened them for public access. He also promoted construction in 1876 of a laboratory dedicated to meteorology and study of magnetic fields on the outskirts of the park. Pavlovsk became a popular residence and by 1874 had 323 summer cottages. The celebrities living here included Alexander Brullov, Peter Clodt von Jürgensburg and Vladimir Sollogub.

=== Birthplace of Russian Scouting ===
On 30 April 1909, a young officer, Colonel Oleg Pantyukhov, organized the first Russian Scout troop Beaver (Бобр, Bobr) in Pavlovsk. In 1910, General Baden-Powell, the founder of the Scout Movement, visited Nicholas II in Tsarskoye Selo. They had a pleasant conversation, and a Scouting badge was issued to Alexei Nikolaevich, Tsarevich of Russia. In 1914, Pantyukhov established a society called Russian Scout (Русский Скаут, Russkiy Skaut). The first Russian Scout campfire was lit in the woods of Pavlovsk Park. After the October Revolution of 1917, and during the Russian Civil War from 1918 to 1920, most of the Scoutmasters and many Scouts fought in the ranks of the White Army and interventionists against the Red Army; the Scout movement was therefore regarded negatively in the Soviet Union and disbanded after the war.

=== Soviet era to present ===
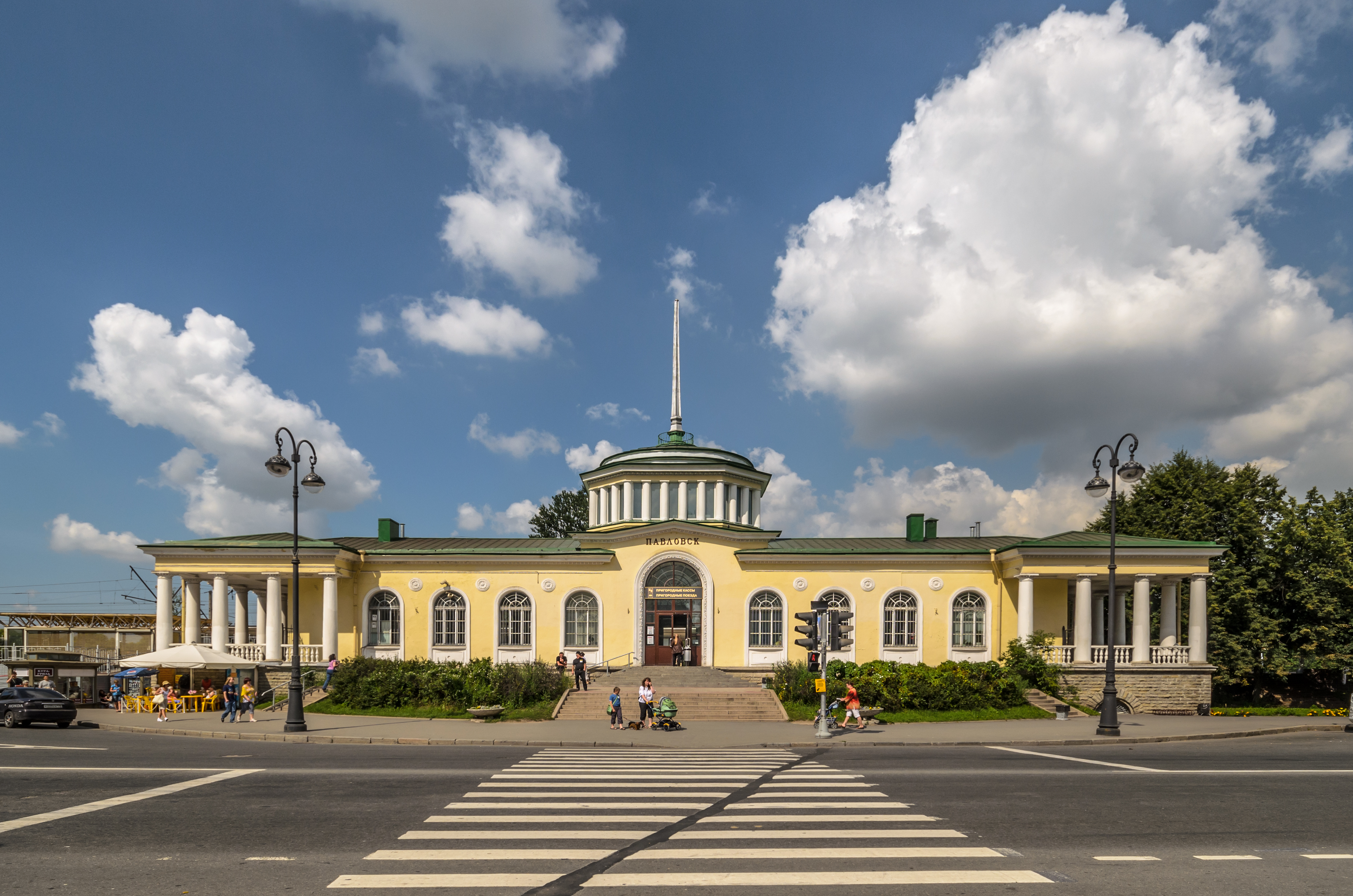
Railway station of Pavlovsk

After the October Revolution of 1917, the Pavlovsk palace and park were nationalized and converted to a public-access museum. In a general motion to replace the Tsar's name, the town was renamed to Slutsk, after revolutionary Vera Slutskaya who died nearby in 1917. Later it was often mentioned in the documents under a double name Slutsk (Pavlovsk), and eventually regained the old name in 1944.

Pavlovsk suffered much from the German occupation during World War II (16 September 1941 – 24 January 1944) – the entire water system of the park and about 70,000 trees were destroyed, the palace was severely damaged by the fire of January 1944, and about 40% of exhibitions were stolen or destroyed (the rest was evacuated to Siberia before the arrival of the Germans). The old train station was burned down and rebuilt in the 1950s by A. E. Levinson. The town was liberated as a result of the Krasnoye Selo–Ropsha offensive. Restoration works started in 1944 and were completed by 1973. Nowadays about 1.5 million tourists visit Pavlovsk annually.

In 1954, Pavlovsk was transferred under the jurisdiction of St. Petersburg. In 1989, it was included into the UNESCO list of World Heritage Sites as part of the Saint Petersburg and Related Groups of Monuments. In 2003, historical names were returned to dozens of streets of Pavlovsk which had been renamed during the Soviet era.

== Geology ==
The town is located on the Neva Lowland, to the left of the river Neva, in the valley of the Slavyanka River. The landscape is quite varied and contains hills, ridges and terraces intermixed with valleys, plains, forests and farmland. Numerous springs give rise to streams and feed ponds. In the Paleozoic era, 300–400 million years ago, the area was covered by a sea. Sediments of that time form a layer thicker than 200 meters on top of the Baltic Shield consisting of granite, gneiss and diabase. The modern topography was shaped by the glacier retreat some 12,000 years ago which created the Littorina Sea. About 4,000 years ago the sea receded and formed the valley of the Neva River which has not changed much over the last 2,500 years.

== Climate ==
The climate of Pavlovsk is temperate and wet, it has a continental climate. The length of the day varies from 5 hours and 51 minutes in the winter solstice to 18 hours and 50 minutes in the summer solstice. Summer is short and moderately warm, whereas winter is long and uneven, with frequent thaws. Air temperatures above 0 °C (32 °F) prevail from early April to mid-November. The coldest month is February. Winds mostly blow southward and frequently change air mass above the city. Summer is dominated by westerly and northwesterly winds, and the wind direction changes to westerly and southwesterly in winter. The cloudiest months are November, December and January, and the least cloudy are May, June and July. There are at least 240 sunny days per year. Between May 25 and July 16, white nights are observed when the sun only briefly goes over the horizon and the day lasts nearly nineteen hours. The area is mostly fed by surface and ground waters.

Climate data for Pavlovsk
Month	Jan	Feb	Mar	Apr	May	Jun	Jul	Aug	Sep	Oct	Nov	Dec	Year
Record high °F	47.5	50.4	58.8	77.5	87.6	94.3	95.5	92.3	86.7	69.8	54.1	51.6	95.5
Mean daily maximum °F	27.9	29.5	39.4	48.6	61.0	68.9	72.0	69.1	58.3	47.3	35.2	30.7	48.9
Daily mean °F	20.3	21.2	29.5	39.9	51.6	60.4	63.9	61.5	51.8	42.1	31.8	25.0	41.4
Mean daily minimum °F	17.8	18.1	26.8	34.9	44.8	53.4	57.2	55.4	46.4	38.7	28.2	22.1	37.0
Record low °F	−32.6	−31.4	−21.8	−7.2	20.1	32.2	40.8	34.3	26.4	8.8	−8.0	−29.9	−32.6
Average precipitation inches	1.6	1.2	1.4	1.3	1.5	2.5	3.1	3.0	2.6	2.6	2.2	1.9	24.9
Record high °C	8.6	10.2	14.9	25.3	30.9	34.6	35.3	33.5	30.4	21.0	12.3	10.9	35.3
Mean daily maximum °C	−2.3	−1.4	4.1	9.2	16.1	20.5	22.2	20.6	14.6	8.5	1.8	−0.7	9.4
Daily mean °C	−6.5	−6.0	−1.4	4.4	10.9	15.8	17.7	16.4	11.0	5.6	−0.1	−3.9	5.2
Mean daily minimum °C	−7.9	−7.7	−2.9	1.6	7.1	11.9	14.0	13.0	8.0	3.7	−2.1	−5.5	2.8
Record low °C	−35.9	−35.2	−29.9	−21.8	−6.6	0.1	4.9	1.3	−3.1	−12.9	−22.2	−34.4	−35.9
Average precipitation mm	40	31	35	33	38	64	78	77	67	65	56	49	633

== Soil, vegetation and wildlife ==
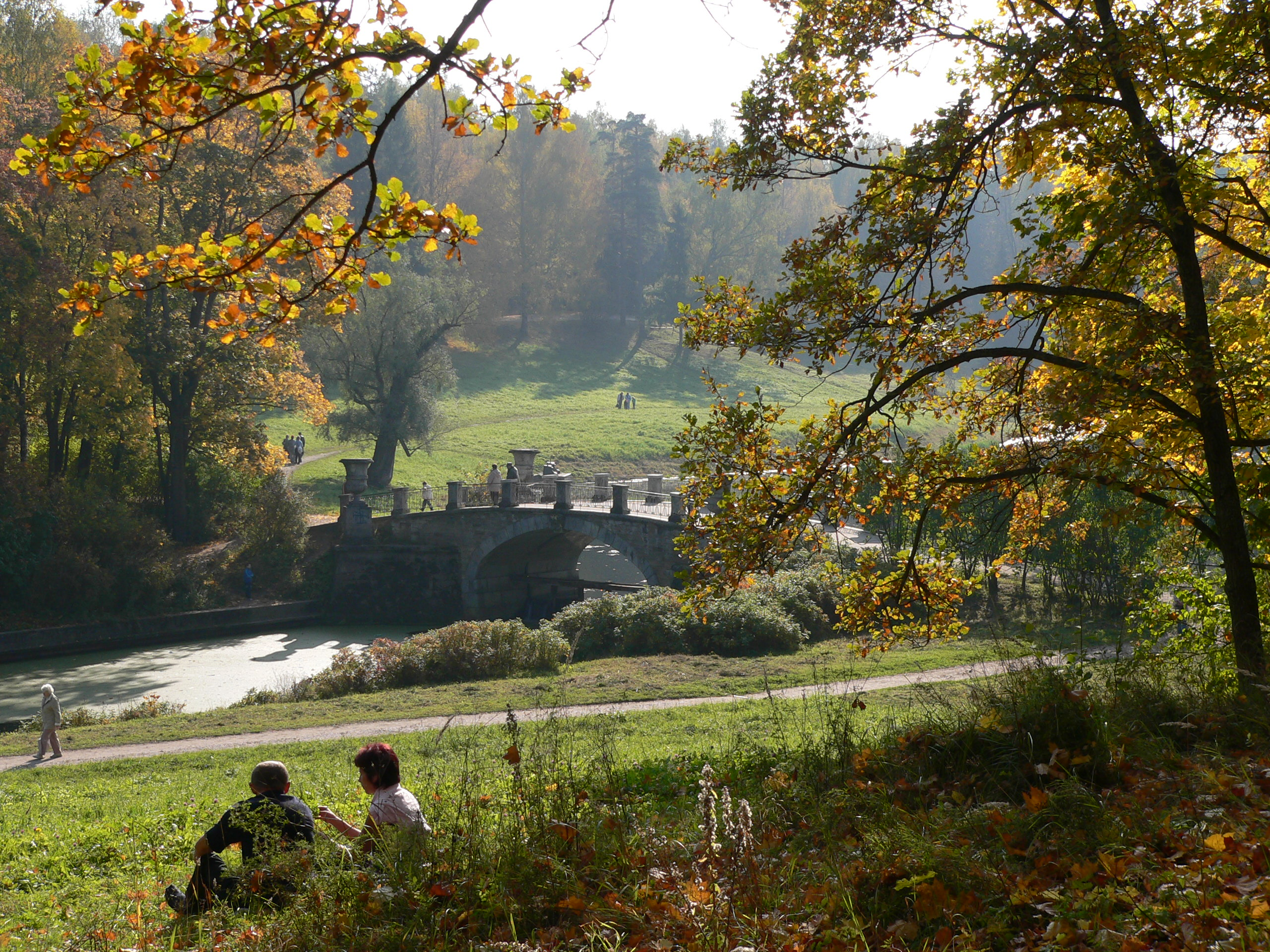
Viskontiev Bridge over the Slavyanka River in Pavlovsk Park

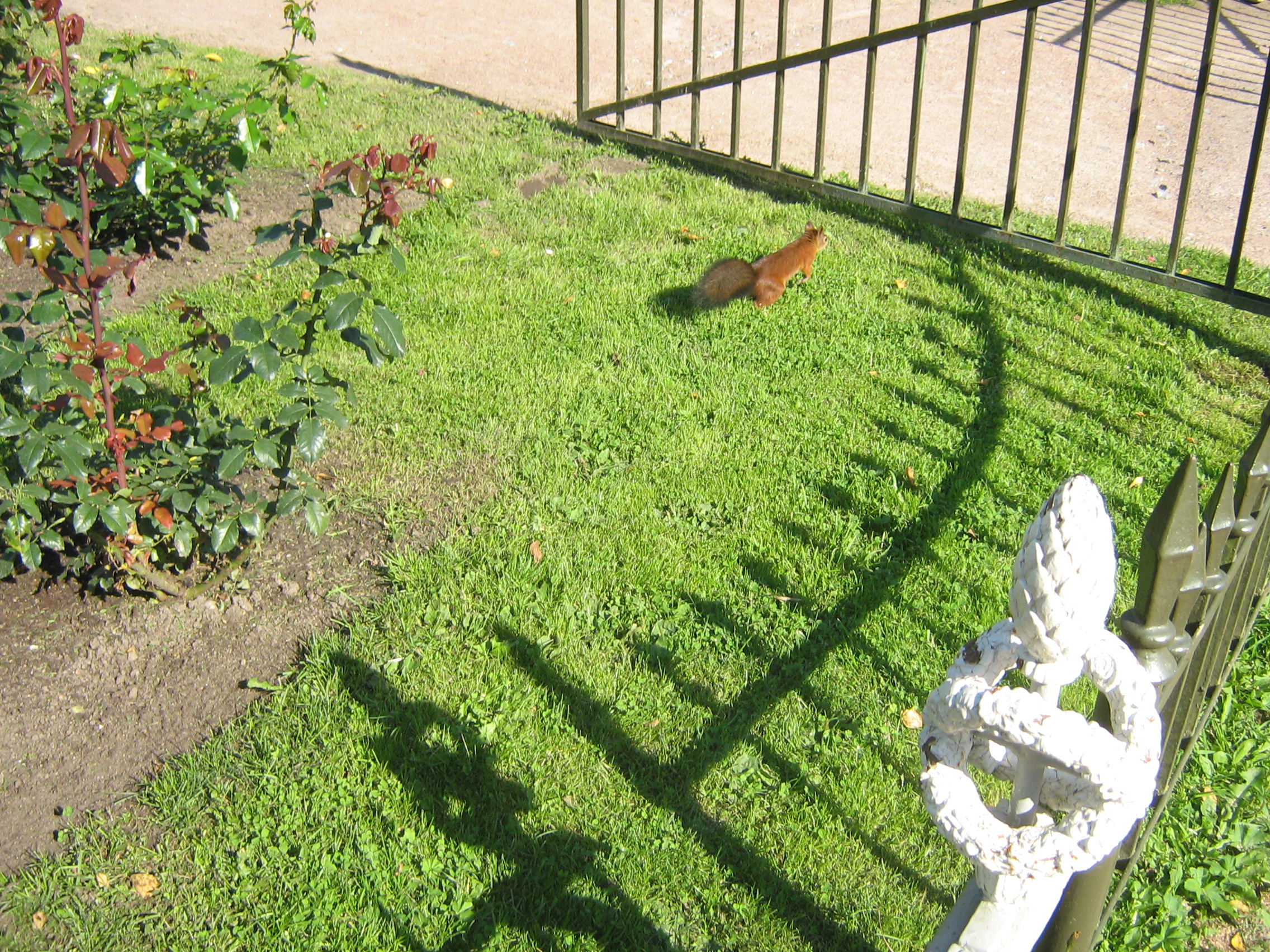
Squirrel in Pavlovsk Park

Prior to the founding of the town the area was covered by temperate coniferous forests (mostly pine and fir) with an admixture of broad-leaved trees and fens. The soils were mostly podzol, combined with peat and gleysols. Intensive economic activities changed the original forest landscape to agricultural land with small groves of aspen, birch, alder and willow. In the 18–19th centuries, a large park area of almost 600 hectares (Pavlovsk and Arensky parks) has been created in and around the city.

Owing to the parks and environment-friendly policies, the Pavlovsk area has relatively low level of pollution. In 1978–1983 the Pavlovsk Park contained more than 360,000 trees of 54 species: 16 species of spruce, pine, larch and fir, two species of birch, two species of willow, two of basswood, oaks, elm, alder, aspen, European rowan, bird cherry, 88 shrub species, of which the dominant were yellow acacia, meadowsweet and dogwoods. In 1978, there were 71 species of birds belonging to 28 families and 9 orders. Mammals include squirrels, hares, weasels, stoats, moles, shrews, hedgehogs, red voles and muskrats. In winter, the parks are sometimes visited by fox, wild boar and moose. Amphibians and reptiles are mostly frogs, toads and lizards. There are 87 species of insects belonging to 46 families.

As most rivers of Saint Petersburg, the Slavyanka River is polluted. Water analysis performed by Greenpeace in 2008 reveals contamination levels exceeding the permissible norms by tens or hundreds times, with such chemicals as oil, lead, acetone, mercury, chloroform and others. Most pollution originates from household waste deposited by 16 companies.

== Population ==
As of the 2010 Census, 16,087 people lived in Pavlovsk of which 45.3% were males and 54.7% females.

Population of Pavlovsk
Year	1780	1794	1897	1959	1970	1979	1989	1991	1998	2002	2010
Population	54	300	4,900	16,600	21,000	25,200	25,536	25,400	24,800	14,960	16,087

== Politics ==
On 3 June 1797, the City Council was established, headed by the chief administrator. It controlled the entire life of Pavlovsk.

The modern structure of local government bodies consists of:

- the representative body of the municipal formation - the Municipal Council. Operating since 1997. As a result of the elections on 14 September 2014, a new composition of the 5th convocation was elected. Of the 10 deputies, 8 are from United Russia, 2 are self-nominated. (one self-nominated candidate later resigned).
- The head of the municipal entity. Exercises the powers of the chairman of the Municipal Council and is the highest official of the municipal entity.
- The executive and administrative body of the municipality is the Local Administration.

The head of the municipality of the city of Pavlovsk is Valery Viktorovich Zibarev.

The head of the local administration of the city of Pavlovsk is Mikhail Yuryevich Syzrantsev.

== Coat of arms ==
The first coat of arms of Pavlovsk was approved by Alexander I in 1801. It features a black double-headed eagle with a white Maltese cross on its chest and the Order of St. Andrew hanging on a chain under it. On top of the cross there is a red shield with a monogram combining Russian italic letters П and М standing for Emperor Paul and Empress Maria. The eagle has gilded beaks and paws. It holds a ceremonial mace and globus cruciger in the paws; it is crowned with two golden crowns with two more crowns near its heads. The whole composition is placed on a golden shield. There was a proposal of an alternative coat during the Soviet times, but it was not approved. The updated coat of arms was adopted on 19 September 2007. It has the same composition but with slightly simplified shapes and colors. The modern flag of Pavlovsk was adopted on the same day. It contains the coat image on a yellow rectangle with the length to width ratio of 3:2.

== Cityscape ==
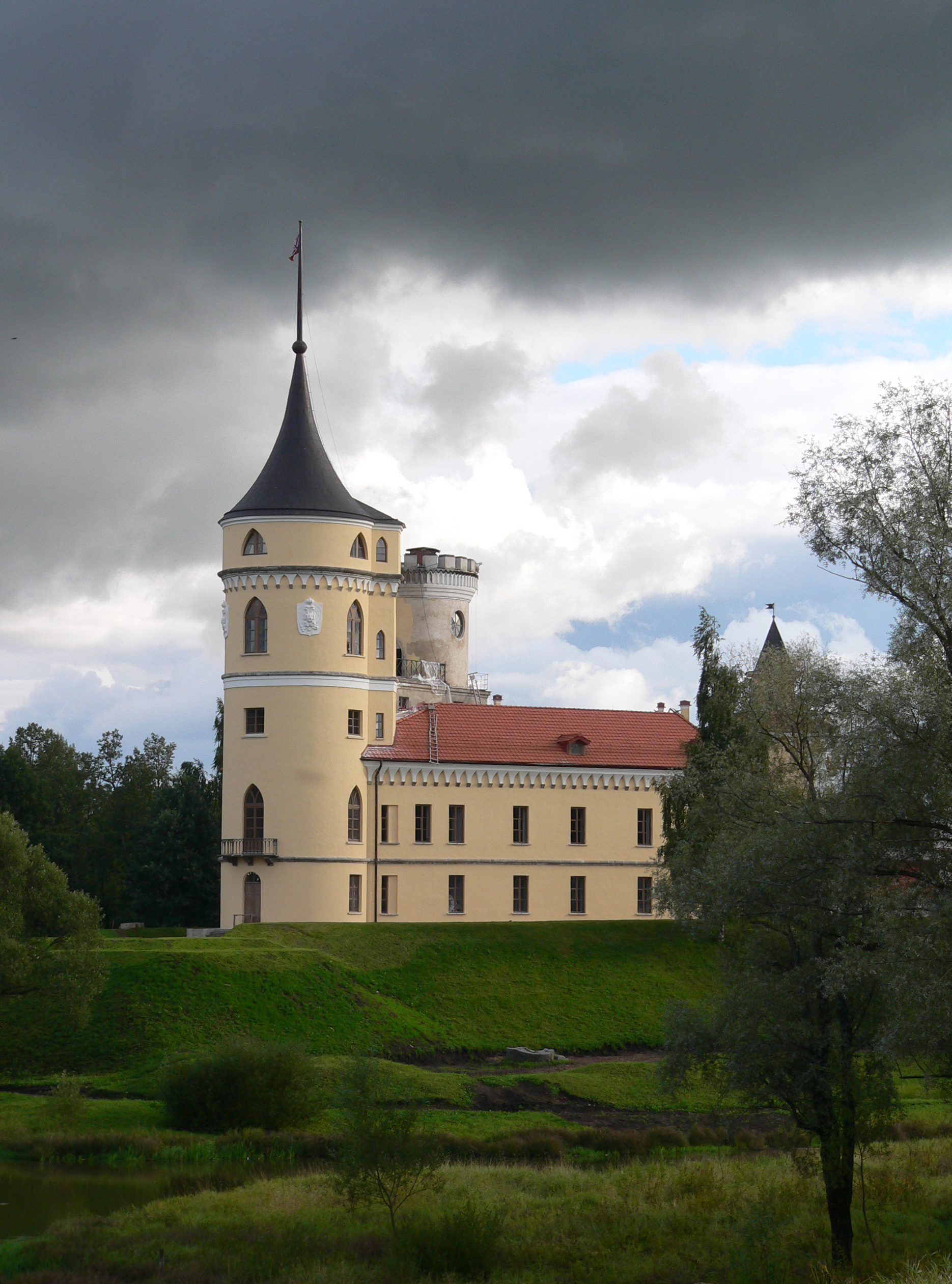
Bip fortress in 2010

The center of the town is Pavlovsk Palace consisting of main body and wings connected with it by galleries. In front of the palace, welcoming the visitors stands bronze monument of Paul. It is an 1872 copy of the original cast by Giovanni Vitali. North to it lies Pavlovsk Park which covers 2/3 of the town area. With the area of about 600 hectares, the park is one of the largest in Russia and Europe. Seven parts are distinguished within the park. There are numerous pavilions, and one part contains a collection of bronze statues. The Bip fortress, a favorite of young Paul I, was burned down during World War II and only its walls remained; it was restored by 2010.

Before 1917 there was no separation between the imperial residence and the town, and both belonged to one owner. Along the southern and western borders of the park run the main street, which is now called Sadovaya Street, and its previous names were Fyodorovskaya (before 1783), Tsarskoselskaya (1783–1919) and Revolyutsii (Soviet time). On the west, this street leads to the train terminal and then to Pushkin. The western border of the town is the railway St. Petersburg – Vitebsk.

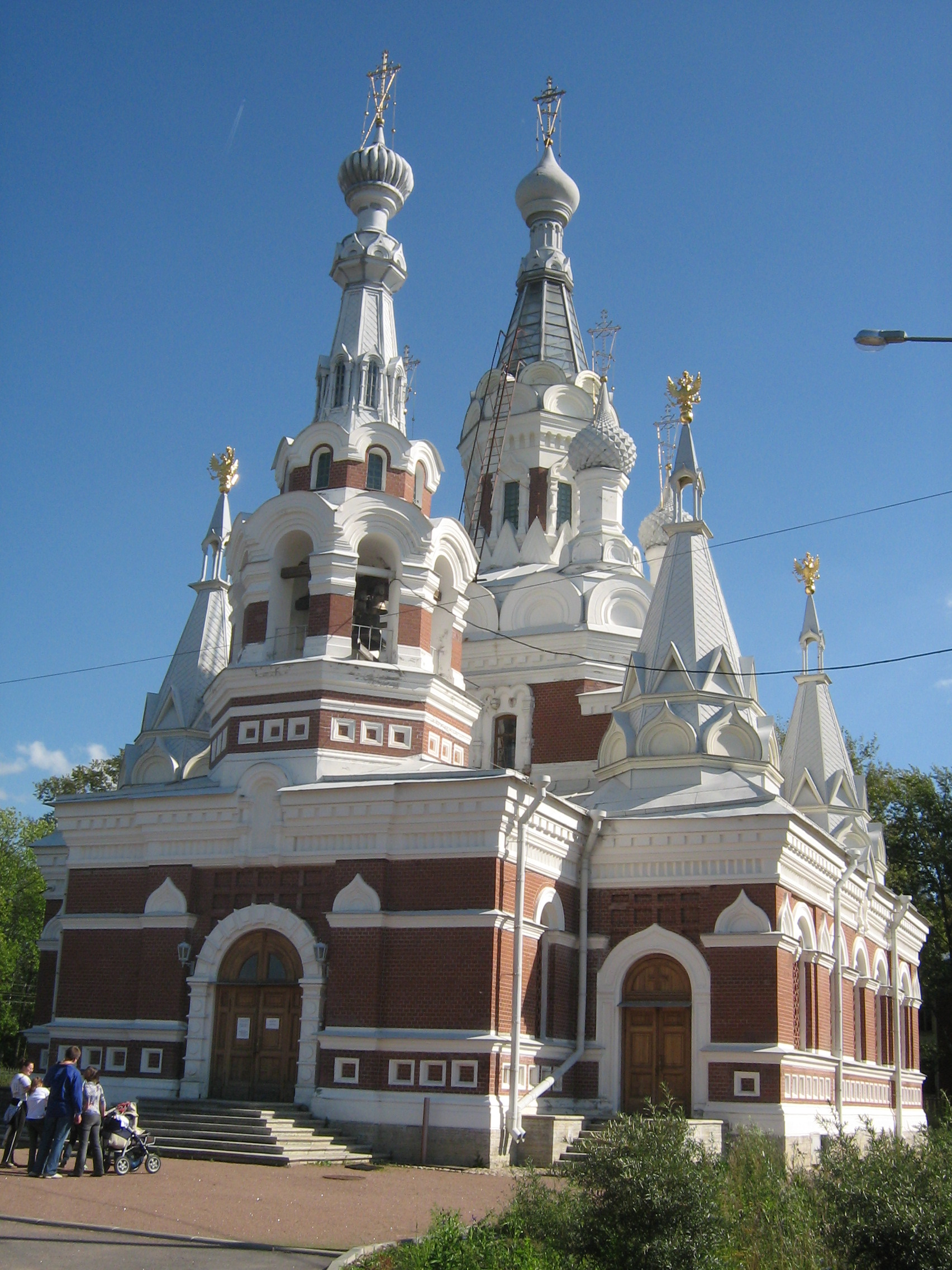
Cathedral of St. Nicholas in honor of Paul I

There are several churches near the palace, the oldest being Maria Magdalena Church and Church of Peter and Paul (built in 1799 by Brenna). The former was raised in 1781–1784 by Giacomo Quarenghi and is the first classical stone building in Pavlovsk. More prominent however is the Cathedral of St. Nicholas in honor of Paul I, an active Orthodox church built in 1900–1904 by Alexander von Hohen in the Russian Revival style.

== Education ==
Gorchakov Memorial School is a private boarding school that opened in 1999 in Pavlovsk. It was named after Russian diplomat Alexander Gorchakov, a classmate of Alexander Pushkin'

== Notable residents ==
- Paul I of Russia – Emperor of Russia and owner of Pavlovsk between 1796 and 1801.
- Grand Duke Konstantin Konstantinovich of Russia (1858–1915) – grandson of Nicholas I of Russia, a poet and playwright, President of the St. Petersburg Academy of Sciences, owner of Pavlovsk between 1882 and 1915. Died in Pavlovsk.
- Grand Duke Konstantin Nikolayevich of Russia (1827–1882) – son of Nicholas I of Russia, admiral of the Russian fleet and reformer of the Imperial Russian Navy, owner of Pavlovsk between 1849 and 1882. Died in Pavlovsk.
- Grand Duke Michael Pavlovich of Russia (1798–1849) – son of Paul I of Russia and Maria Feodorovna, Empress of Russia. Owner of Pavlovsk between 1828 and 1849.
- Prince John Konstantinovich of Russia (1886–1918) – son of Grand Duke Konstantin Konstantinovich of Russia and owner of Pavlovsk between 1915 and 1918. Born in Pavlovsk.
- Grand Duchess Maria Nikolaevna of Russia, Duchess of Leuchtenberg (1819–1876) – daughter of Emperor Nicholas I of Russia, sister of Alexander II and wife of Maximilian de Beauharnais, 3rd Duke of Leuchtenberg. She was an art collector and President of the Imperial Academy of Arts of Saint Petersburg. Born in Pavlovsk.
- Maria Feodorovna (Sophie Dorothea of Württemberg) (1759–1828) – the second wife of Tsar Paul I of Russia and mother of Tsar Alexander I and Tsar Nicholas I of Russia. Owner of Pavlovsk between 1788 and 1828. Died in Pavlovsk.
- Olga Constantinovna of Russia (1851–1926) – queen consort of King George I of Greece and briefly in 1920, queen regent of Greece. The great-grandmother of Queen Sofía of Spain, the paternal grandmother of Prince Philip, Duke of Edinburgh, and the great-grandmother of Charles III. Born in Pavlovsk.
- Georg Ludwig Cancrin (1774–1845) – writer and statesman, General and Minister of Finances, died in Pavlovsk.
- Eugene Lanceray (1875–1946) – Russian graphic artist, painter, sculptor, mosaicist, and illustrator, born in Pavlovsk.
- Aleksandr Nikitenko (1804–1877) – literature critic and historian, academician of the St. Petersburg Academy of Sciences. Died in Pavlovsk.
- Leonid Yanush (1897–1978) – a painter who lived in Pavlovsk between 1912 and 1927.

== Bibliography ==
- Darinskii AV (1982). География Ленинграда (Geography of Leningrad). St. Petersburg: Lenizdat.
- Hayden, Peter (2005). Russian Parks and Gardens. Frances Lincoln. ISBN 0-7112-2430-7.
- Lanceray, Nikolay (2006). Vincenzo Brenna (Винченцо Бренна) (in Russian). Saint Petersburg: Kolo. ISBN 5-901841-34-4.
- Shvidkovsky, Dmitry (2007). Russian architecture and the West. Yale University Press. ISBN 978-0-300-10912-2.
