= Slavyansky (rural locality) =

Slavyansky (Russian: Славя́нский; masculine), Slavyanskaya (Славя́нская; feminine), or Slavyanskoye (Славя́нское; neuter) is the name of several rural localities in Russia:

- Slavyansky, Kabardino-Balkar Republic, a khutor in Maysky District of the Kabardino-Balkar Republic
- Slavyansky, Stavropol Krai, a khutor in Mineralovodsky District of Stavropol Krai
- Slavyanskoye (rural locality), a village in Sherbakulsky District of Omsk Oblast
