= Yale Russian Chorus =

Choral ensemble at Yale University (founded 1953)

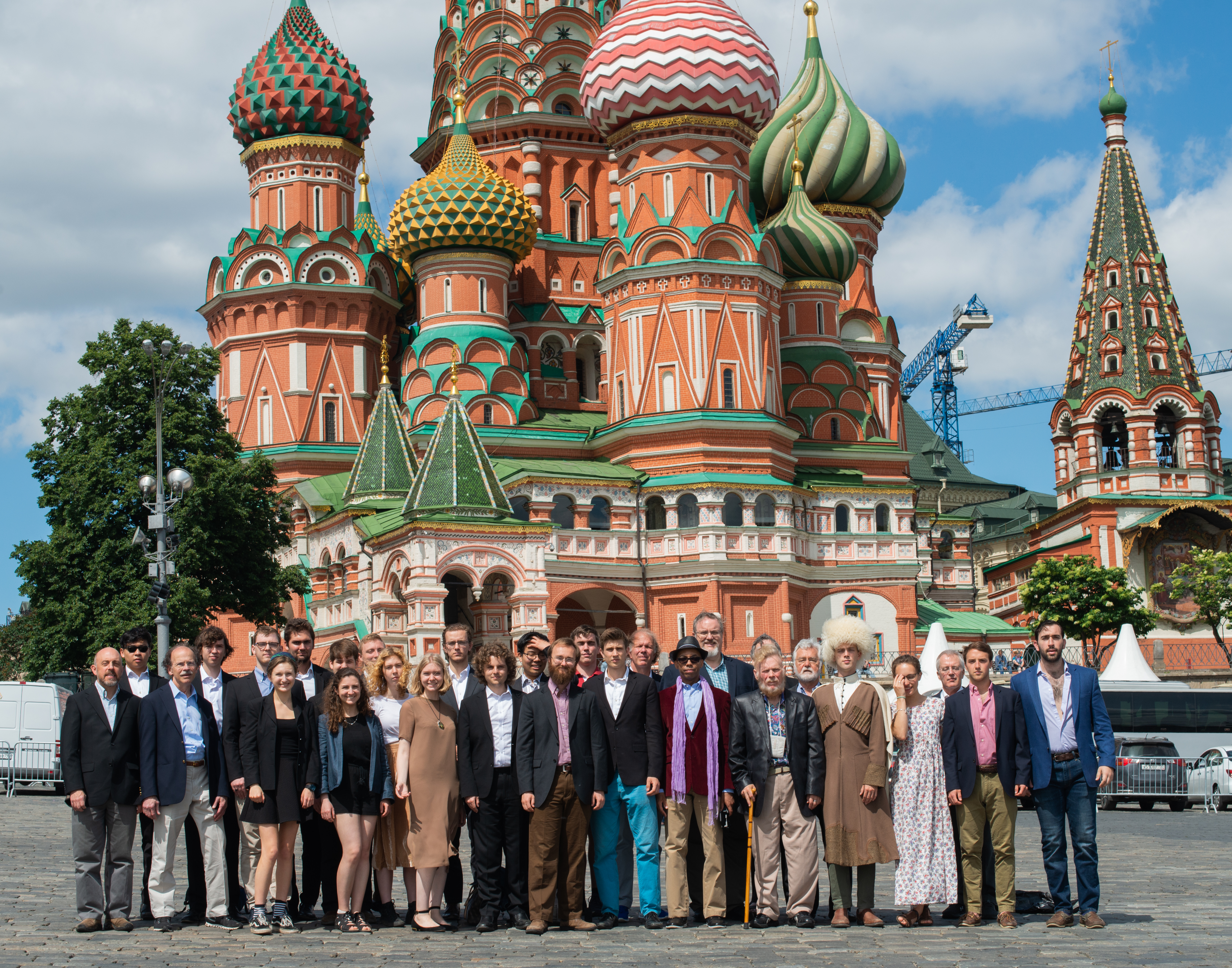
- Members of the Yale Russian Chorus in front of Saint Basil's Cathedral during its 2019 Russia tour.

Background information
- Origin: Yale University
- Genre: Choral
- Years active: 1953–present
- Members: Tristan Swangstu, President; Mason Mifflin, Music Director; Kenny Wang, Assistant Music Director; NeNe McDonald, Business Manager
- Website: http://yalerussianchorus.org

The Yale Russian Chorus is a tenor-bass choral ensemble at Yale University, established in 1953 by Denis Mickiewicz, a student at the Yale Music School, and George Litton, president of the Yale Russian Club. The group sings a variety of secular and sacred Slavic choral pieces (and non-Slavic pieces from the former USSR and neighboring regions), from the 12th century onward, including folk songs of Russia and Eastern Europe. The current president is Tristan Swangstu, and the current musical directors are Mason Mifflin and Kenny Wang.

The YRC was the first American group to visit the Soviet Union as a private initiative, touring the country in 1958 following the signing of the Lacy-Zarubin Agreement on cultural exchange. The YRC made 16 tours to the USSR before the union dissolved in 1991. The ensemble tours domestically every spring.

The chorus rehearses for two and a half hours every week, holds concerts in and around New Haven throughout the academic year, and goes on an annual spring tour. Although the majority of its members are Yale undergraduate students, auditions are open to the entire New Haven community. As a tenor-bass chorus, membership is primarily male, but the chorus has also admitted women to sing in the tenor section.

The chorus has performed at many venues in Russia and Ukraine, and also many places in the United States, most notably:

- Carnegie Hall in New York City
- The White House (for President Bill Clinton)
- The Smithsonian Institution
- The Russian Cultural Center in Washington, D.C.
- The Winter Garden Theatre in Manhattan
- The radio show A Prairie Home Companion

The Alumni of the Yale Russian Chorus have formed a performing group in their own right to preserve the Mickiewicz tradition and presented a 60th Anniversary concert at Yale in November 2013. In November 2014 the Alumni of the Yale Russian Chorus performed at Rockport Music in Rockport, Massachusetts, at the Shalin Liu Performance Center in a shared performance with the Yale Slavic Chorus. The Yale Russian Chorus Alumni sang a full-length concert in April 2015 at St. Mary's Episcopal Church, Philadelphia, on the UPenn campus. Musical examples from a YRC alumni concert at Duke University in November 2009 include Akh ty step shirokaya (Ах, ты степь широкая) ("O thou steppe so wide"), Blazhen Muzh (Блажен муж) ("Blessed is the man"), Borodino (Бородино) ("Borodino" [a poem by M.Yu.Lermontov commemorating the battle against Napoleon's armies in the village outside Moscow]), Kas Tie Tadi (Who Are They), and Zhilo dvenadtsat razboinikov (Жило двенадцать разбойников) ("There were 12 robbers").

In 1978, following the YRC's 25th anniversary concert in Carnegie Hall, alumni Paul Andrews, John McCarthy, and Peter Gleick volunteered to help organize concerts for the group in the San Francisco Bay Area. This led to the founding of Slavyanka in 1979.

== Foreign tours ==
- USSR 1958
- USSR 1959
- USSR 1960
- Western Europe 1962
- Western Europe and USSR 1963
- Eastern Europe 1968
- USSR 1971
- USSR 1977 (including Leningrad, Moscow, Tbilisi, Kiev)
- USSR 1979
- USSR 1982
- USSR, Poland and Western Europe 1984
- USSR and Western Europe 1987
- Russia, Ukraine, Georgia 1990
- Russia, Ukraine 1993
- Russia 1994
- Ukraine 1995
- Russia 2004 (Alumni group)
- Canada (Montreal/Quebec) 2009
- Russia 2019
- Georgia, Armenia 2025
