= Slavyanka, Voronezh Oblast =

Slavyanka Славянка
- Khutor
- Location within Voronezh Oblast Location within Russia
- Coordinates: 50°10′N 39°47′E
- Country: Russia
- Region: Voronezh Oblast
- District: Rossoshansky District
- Time zone: UTC+3:00

Slavyanka (Russian: Славянка) is a rural locality (a khutor) in Yevstratovskoye Rural Settlement, Rossoshansky District, Voronezh Oblast, Russia. The population was 65 as of 2010.

== Geography ==
Slavyanka is located 21 km east of Rossosh (the district's administrative centre) by road. Yevstratovka is the nearest rural locality.
