= Denis Mickiewicz =

Denis Mickiewicz, born into a Russian family in Latvia, is a founding conductor of the Yale Russian Chorus and professor emeritus of Russian literature at Duke University. He emigrated first to Austria and then to the United States in 1952. He was presented with a Festschrift in his honor in 2009.
