= Slavyanka (a cappella group) =

American Slavic-language a cappella group (founded 1979)

- Origin: 1979, in San Francisco, California, U.S.
- Genre: Classical
- Members: Irina Shachneva (director)
- Style: A cappella
- Website: slavyankachorus.org

Slavyanka is an American a cappella vocal group based in San Francisco. Their repertoire consists largely of religious and secular music performed in a variety of Slavic languages. Most of the group's singers have full-time jobs outside the group and do not speak the languages sung. Originally a men's chorus, the group expanded to include women in 2013. It is currently under the direction of Irina Shachneva.

== History ==
Slavyanka was founded in 1979 by a group of former Yale Russian Chorus members including Paul Andrews, John McCarthy, and Peter Gleick. The name "Slavyanka" was chosen in reference to a 19th-century Slavic name for California's Russian River. In 1983, the group became a 501(c)(3) nonprofit. Directors of the group have included founder Paul Andrews (1979–1993), Aleksei Shipovalnikov (1993–1996), Gregory Smirnov (1996–2011), and Irina Shachneva (2011–Present). The group began with around 15 men and presently has a rotating membership of around 40 men and women.

Slavyanka has sung over 400 concerts. The group toured the Soviet Union in 1986, 1989, and 1999, and returned for a tour of Russia in 2016. In 1986, they were the first American chorus to perform in Saint Petersburg's Glinka Capella. In 2016, they were the only American choir invited to perform at the 150th anniversary of Moscow's Tchaikovsky Conservatory. In 1986 and 1990, Slavyanka was chosen to perform at the Western Regional Conventions of the American Choral Directors Association. The group performed for Mikhail Gorbachev when he visited San Francisco in 1990.

Notable performances of historic works by the group include Sergei Rachmaninoff's All-Night Vigil, the Western premiere of Aleksei Shipovalnikov's Vespers, and the U.S. premiere of Konstantin Shvedov's Liturgy of St. John Chrysostom, recovered from secreted Soviet negatives.

Slavyanka's performed languages have included Russian, Ukrainian, Old Slavonic, Armenian, Croatian, Latvian, Lithuanian, Macedonian, Slovene, Georgian, and Svan. Some of their repertoire incorporates Tuvan throat singing.

== Discography ==
Slavyanka has recorded 10 albums:

- Russian Church Music (1988)
- Russia Old & New (1991)
- Konstantin Shvedov: Liturgy of Saint John Chrysostom (1991)
- Little Odessa (1994) – movie soundtrack
- Slavyanka Sounds of Heaven (1999)
- Slavyanka in Concert, Mission San Luis Obispo (1999)
- Song of the Volga Boatmen (2000)
- With Love from the Balkans and Caucasus (2003)
- Slavyanka Russian Favorites (2004)
- Slavyanka in Russia (2016)

In addition, Slavyanka's music has been featured in the films Tell Me a Riddle (1980), Little Odessa (1994), and What Dreams May Come (1998).

== See also ==
- Yale Russian Chorus
