= Vera Slutskaya =

Russian revolutionary (1874–1917)

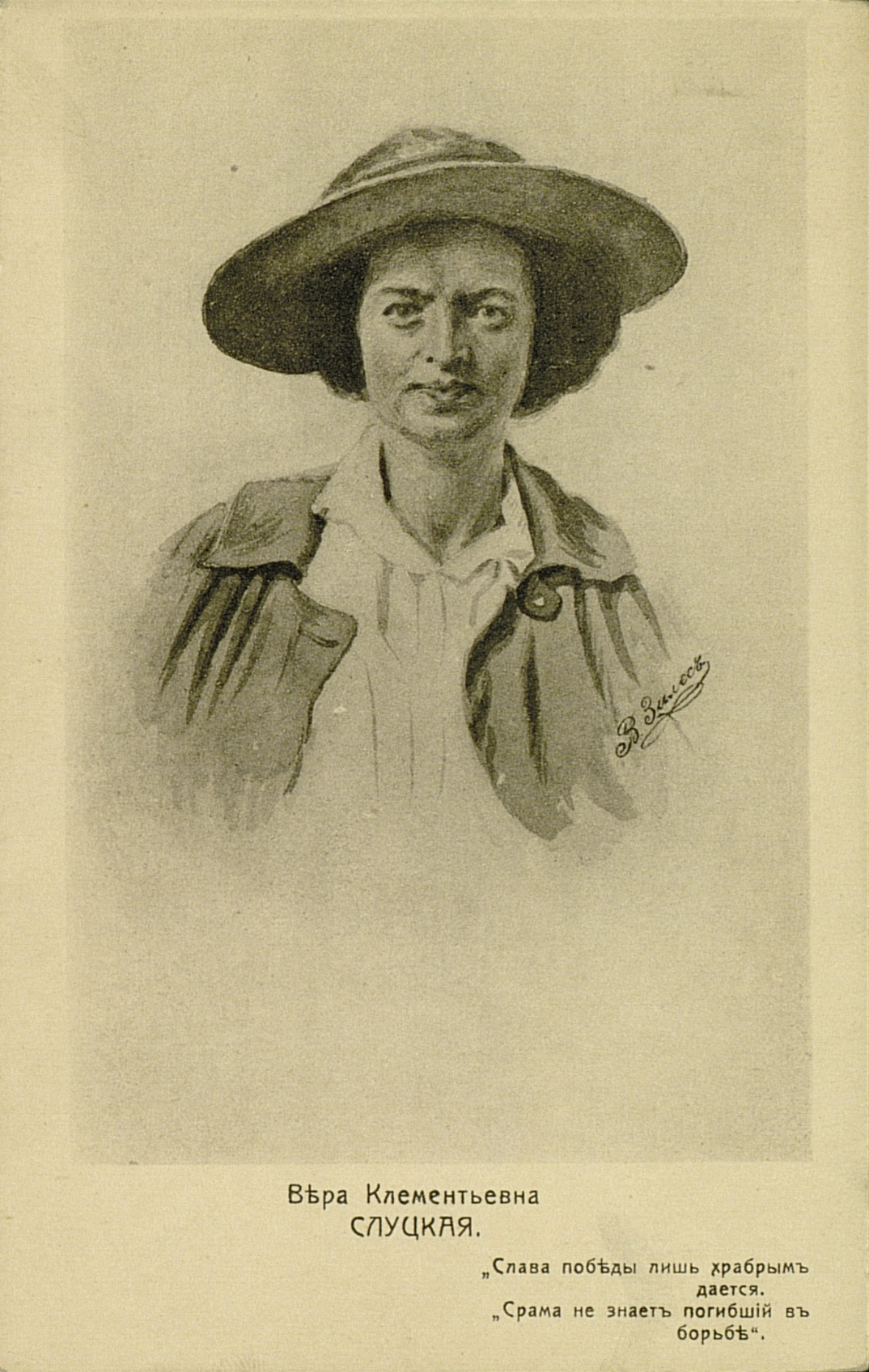
Russian postcard with a portrait of Slutskaya, December 1917

Vera Klimentievna Slutskaya (17 September 1874 – 12 November 1917) was a Russian revolutionary and Bolshevik member of the Duma. She participated in the February and October revolutions and was shot by Cossacks near Petrograd during the latter.

Born Bertha Bronislavovna in Mir, in Minsk Governorate, in a middle-class Jewish family, and educated as a dentist. Vera Klimentjevna Slutskaya participated in the revolutionary movement since 1898. After an arrest, criminal proceedings were instituted against her, and in 1901 she was placed under public oversight of the police. In the same year, she joined the Bund - the Jewish Social-Democratic Party, which was an autonomous organization of the Russian Social Democratic Labor Party (RSDLP); from 1902 she participated in the general work in the RSDLP, after 1903, close to the Bolsheviks. During the First Russian Revolution of 1905-1907, was a member of the combat organization of the RSDLP, took part in the revolutionary struggle in Minsk and St. Petersburg. After being a delegate to the Fifth Congress of the RSDLP (1907), she stayed in Russia and led party work in St. Petersburg.

In 1909 Vera Slutskaya left for emigration, lived in Germany and Switzerland, in 1912 she returned to her homeland, where since 1913 she was engaged in party work in the capital St. Petersburg. For her work she was repeatedly arrested, and in 1914 she was in exile in Lubani.

Participated in the February Revolution of 1917; during the "dual power" worked in the Petrograd Committee of the RSDLP as a party organizer among the female population and secretary of the Vasileostrovsky District Party Committee. At the semi-legal VI Congress of the RSDLP, she supported the policy of an armed uprising. Then participated in the October armed uprising in Petrograd, after the establishment of Soviet power was sent to suppress the "Kerensky-Krasnov revolt" that broke out on October 26 (November 8). During the suppression of the insurgency of her Red Guards detachment, she was killed when delivering medicines near Tsarskoe Selo, now the city of Pushkin (within St. Petersburg).

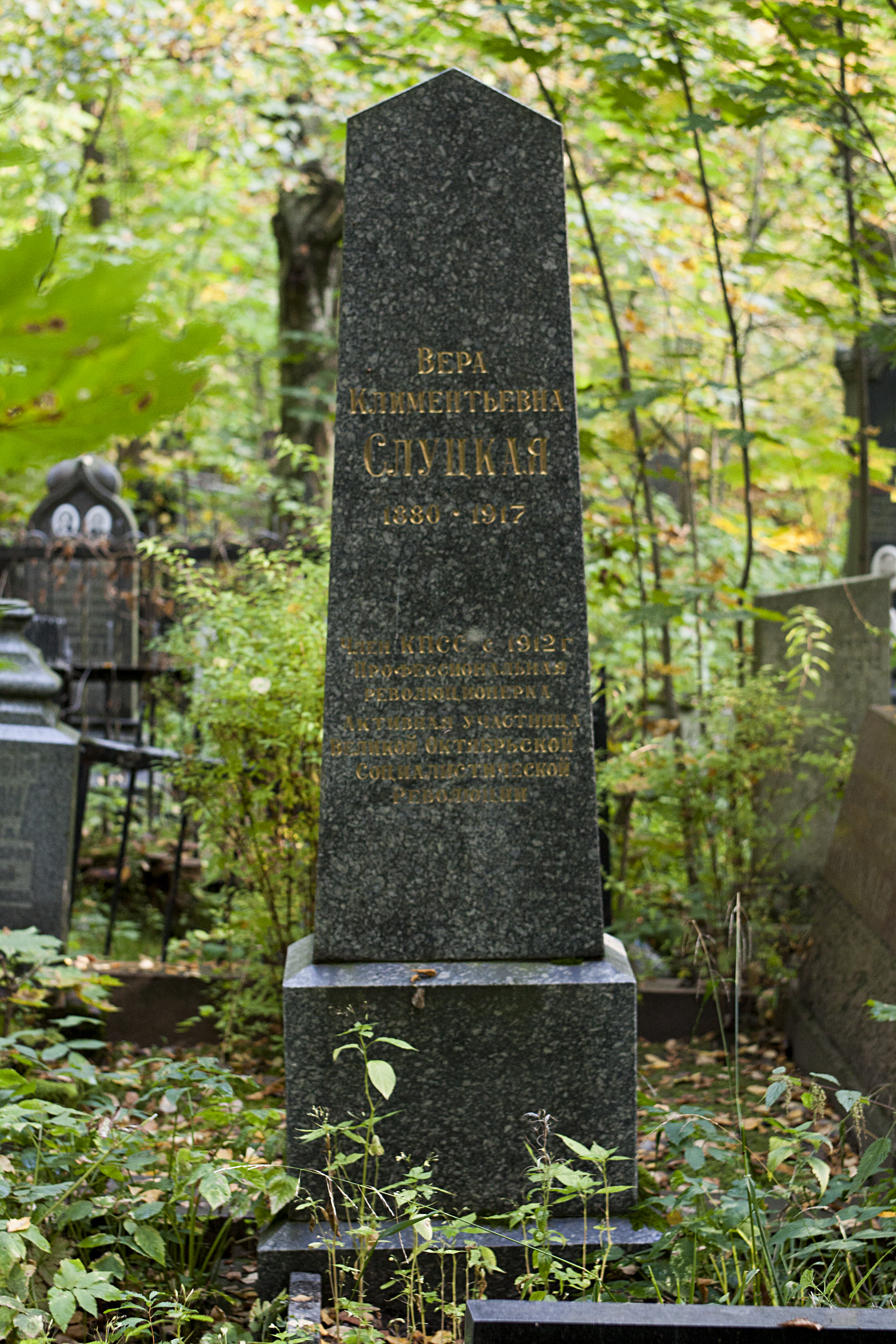
Grave of Vera Slutskaya at the St. Petersburg at the Preobrazhenskoye Jewish cemetery

Vera Slutskaya is buried in St. Petersburg at the Preobrazhenskoye Jewish cemetery.
