= Russian liturgical music =

Russian Liturgical Music is the musical tradition of the Russian Orthodox Church. This tradition began with the importation of the Byzantine Empire's religious music when the Kievan Rus' converted to Orthodoxy in 988.

== Origins ==
When Prince Vladimir of Kiev converted to Orthodoxy, Mount Athos was the musical center of the Orthodox world. Monks from all over Eastern Europe and Byzantium traveled to Mount Athos for musical training and to learn the ways of Orthodox chant. At Mount Athos, Russian monks learned the Byzantine neumatic notation for chant, which they readily adopted and brought back with them to Russia. This Byzantine chant quickly changed to a distinct Russian style, the Znamenny Chant. The chant flourished and spread to the north (Novgorod principally) and southwest.

From the sack of Kiev in 1240 and subsequent occupation of the Rus’ by the Mongols until their expulsion in 1480, few resources regarding Russian music date, but what little records exist show little change to the Znamenny chant other than small notational changes.

== Development ==
In the 16th century, the Russian liturgical tradition split between the north (the Moscow-dominated region) and the southwest (near Kiev). In the North, the Znamenny chant and Demestvenny chant began to grow more elaborate. The neumatic system became increasingly intricate. Additionally, regional variants and neumes became part of the established tradition in those areas, making it nigh impossible for singers to sight-read any chant from paper. The chant itself also became far more melismatic than before. This led to the establishment of singing schools attached to monasteries, the most notable being the Novgorod school. Ivan IV, moved the Novgorod school to Moscow to increase the Kremlin's prestige. The Tsar was also a composer of chant, two of which still exist today in readable and performable condition. Polyphony also appears during this time period in the form of heterophony, which in the Russian tradition meant multiple singers singing the base chant and freely improvising around it while retaining strong ties to the core chant.

In the Southwest, the Orthodox Church based in Kiev faced constant competition from the nearby Catholic Church. To remain equal to the Jesuits, the Church opened many schools that taught laymen to sing and read neumes. They borrowed from Serbian, Bulgarian, and other Orthodox chants and standardized both the notation and teaching method, mixing them together to form a distinctive Kievan chant style. Eventually, during the Polish Renaissance, the Kievan Orthodox Church fully adopted the polyphonic styles popular at the time. They retained the Znamenny chant, 8 echoi (glassy, melodically based Orthodox modes based upon the Byzantine idea), and scale, but adopted the descant style of their Catholic counterparts. The notation also changed to a 5-line staff (unlike the contemporary 4-line staff) with square note heads.

The 17th century was marked by reforms. The chant had grown incredibly cumbersome and bulky, and various Metropolitans attempted to rein the system in. Shaidur was the first, and in 1600 he created a notation that clearly demonstrated the starting pitch of each chant, known as the Shaidurov marking. Tsar Alexei Mikhailovich and Patriarch Nikon patronized the Southwestern style of chant over the Muscovite, adopted both the Jesuit model of education, imported singers from Kiev, and replaced the Znamenny chant with the gestalt used in the Southwest. During Alexei's reign, the Znamenny chant was driven out of popular use.

Over the beginning of the 18th century, the church services grew more Catholic, with the permanent institution of church choirs instead of laity to sing, and the institution of a musical Ordinary, set polyphonically in the Italian style and drawn from the modernized chant and folk songs, called Obychny. The use of choral concertos - short unaccompanied choral compositions, intended for performance in breaks in the liturgy when clergy were taking Holy Communion, was also popular from the mid-seventeenth to early nineteenth centuries.
