= Slavyanka, Sheksninsky District, Vologda Oblast =

Slavyanka Славянка
- Village
- Location within Vologda Oblast Location within Russia
- Coordinates: 59°09′N 38°45′E
- Country: Russia
- Region: Vologda Oblast
- District: Sheksninsky District
- Time zone: UTC+3:00

Slavyanka (Russian: Славянка) is a rural locality (a village) in Lyubomirovskoye Rural Settlement, Sheksninsky District, Vologda Oblast, Russia. The population was 6 as of 2002.

== Geography ==
Slavyanka is located 23 km southeast of Sheksna (the district's administrative centre) by road. Onoshevo is the nearest rural locality.
