= Slavic =

Slavic, Slav or Slavonic may refer to:

== Peoples ==
- Slavic peoples, an ethno-linguistic group living in Europe and Asia
  - East Slavic peoples, eastern group of Slavic peoples
  - South Slavic peoples, southern group of Slavic peoples
  - West Slavic peoples, western group of Slavic peoples
- Anti-Slavic sentiment, negative attitude towards Slavic peoples
- Pan-Slavic movement, movement in favor of Slavic cooperation and unity
- Slavic studies, a multidisciplinary field of studies focused on history and culture of Slavic peoples

== Languages, alphabets, and names ==
- Slavic languages, a group of closely related Indo-European languages
  - Proto-Slavic language, reconstructed proto-language of all Slavic languages
  - Old Church Slavonic, 9th century Slavic literary language, used for the purpose of evangelizing the Slavic peoples
  - Church Slavonic, a written and spoken variant of Old Church Slavonic, standardized and widely adopted by Slavs in the Middle Ages, which became a liturgical language in many Eastern Orthodox churches
  - Pan-Slavic language, artificially created languages intended to serve as a lingua franca for all Slavic peoples
  - East Slavic languages, modern languages of East Slavic peoples
  - South Slavic languages, modern languages of South Slavic peoples
  - West Slavic languages, modern languages of West Slavic peoples
- Slavic names, names originating from the Slavic languages

== Mythology and faith ==
- Slavic mythology, the mythological aspect of the polytheistic religion that was practised by the Slavs before Christianisation
  - Slavic dragon, mythological creature in ancient Slavic culture
- Slavic Native Faith, modern form of ancient Slavic polytheism

== Places ==
- Slav (village), a former Israeli settlement in the Gaza Strip

== Other ==
- Slav Defense, a chess opening
- Slavic calendar, traditional Slavic calendar

== See also ==
- Slavonian (disambiguation)
- Slavyansky (disambiguation)
