= Slavyanka (river) =

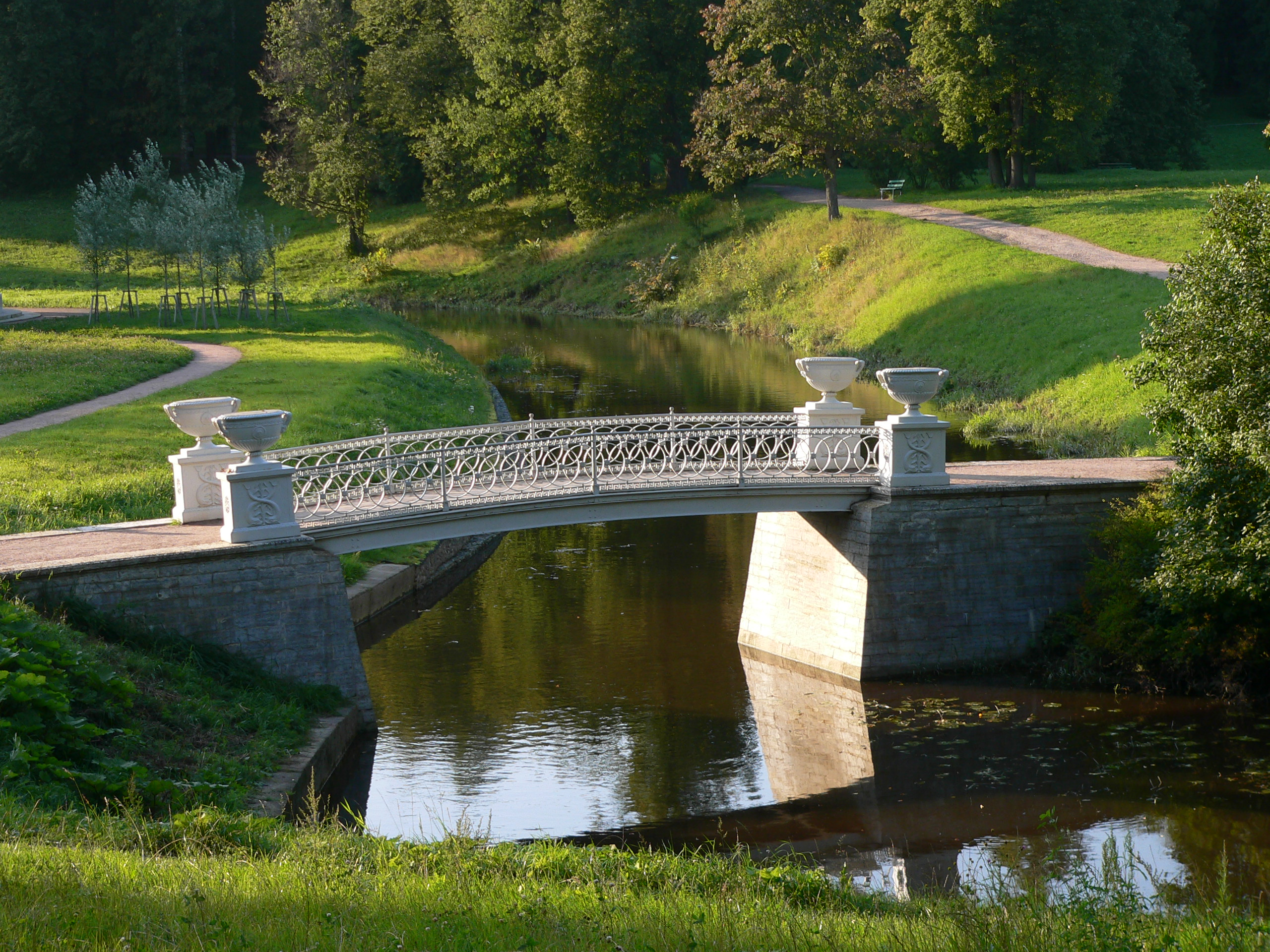

Location
- Country: Russia

Physical characteristics
- Mouth: Neva
  - coordinates: 59.8295°N 30.5204°E
- Length: 39 km (24 mi)
- Basin size: 249 km^{2} (96 sq mi)

Basin features
- Progression: Neva→ Gulf of Finland

The Slavyanka (Russian: Славя́нка) is a river in Leningrad Oblast of Russia. It is a left tributary of the Neva. It is 39 kilometres (24 mi) long, with a drainage basin of 249 square kilometres (96 mi^{2}).

The river begins in swamps 9 kilometres (6 mi) southwest of Pavlovsk, and flows northeast towards Pavlovsk, where it passes through the parks surrounding the large Pavlovsk Palace. It then continues north, and flows into the Neva in the Rybatskoye area of Saint Petersburg. At the mouth the river is about 1.5 metres (4.9 ft) deep. The Slavyanka is a typical slow-moving lowland river.
