= Northern constituency (Saint Petersburg) =

Russian legislative constituency in Saint Petersburg

Northern single-member constituency
- Constituency of the Russian State Duma
- Deputy: Irina Ivanova; Communist Party
- Federal subject: Saint Petersburg
- Districts: Kalininsky (Akademicheskoye, Grazhdanka), Petrogradsky, Tsentralny (Liteyny, Smolninskoye), Vyborgsky (Sampsoniyevskoye, Svetlanovskoye, Shuvalovo-Ozerki, Levashovo, Pargolovo)
- Voters: 553,592 (2026)

The Northern constituency (No.213 (Note: No.207 in 1993-1995, No.209 in 1995-2007)) is a Russian legislative constituency in Saint Petersburg. The constituency stretches from central Saint Petersburg to northern outskirts of the city.

The constituency has been represented since 2026 by Communist deputy Irina Ivanova, former Member of Legislative Assembly of Saint Petersburg and 2021 runner-up for this seat, who won the open seat after two-term Independent incumbent Yevgeny Marchenko failed to collect enough signatures to run.

== Boundaries ==
1993–1995: Kalininsky District (northern part), Vyborgsky District
The constituency covered all of mostly residential Vyborgsky District and part of Kalininsky District in northern Saint Petersburg.

1995–2003: Kalininsky District (part of Grazhdanka, part of Akademicheskoye, Municipal Okrug 21, part of Piskaryovka, Severny, Prometey), Vyborgsky District (Sampsoniyevskoye, Svetlanovskoye, part of Sosnovskoye, Municipal Okrug 15)
Following the 1995 redistricting the constituency was significantly changed, losing northern part of Vyborgsky District to North-Western constituency as well as some precincts in Kalininsky District to Central constituency.

2003–2007: Kalininsky District (Akademicheskoye, Municipal Okrug 21, Severny, Prometey), Vyborgsky District (Sampsoniyevskoye, Svetlanovskoye, Sosnovskoye, Municipal Okrug 15, Parnas)
After the 2003 redistricting the constituency was slightly altered, losing its portions of Grazhdanka and Piskaryovka municipal okrugs to Central constituency. This seat instead gained the rest of Sosnovskoye and Parnas from North-Western constituency as well as the rest of Akademicheskoye from Central constituency.

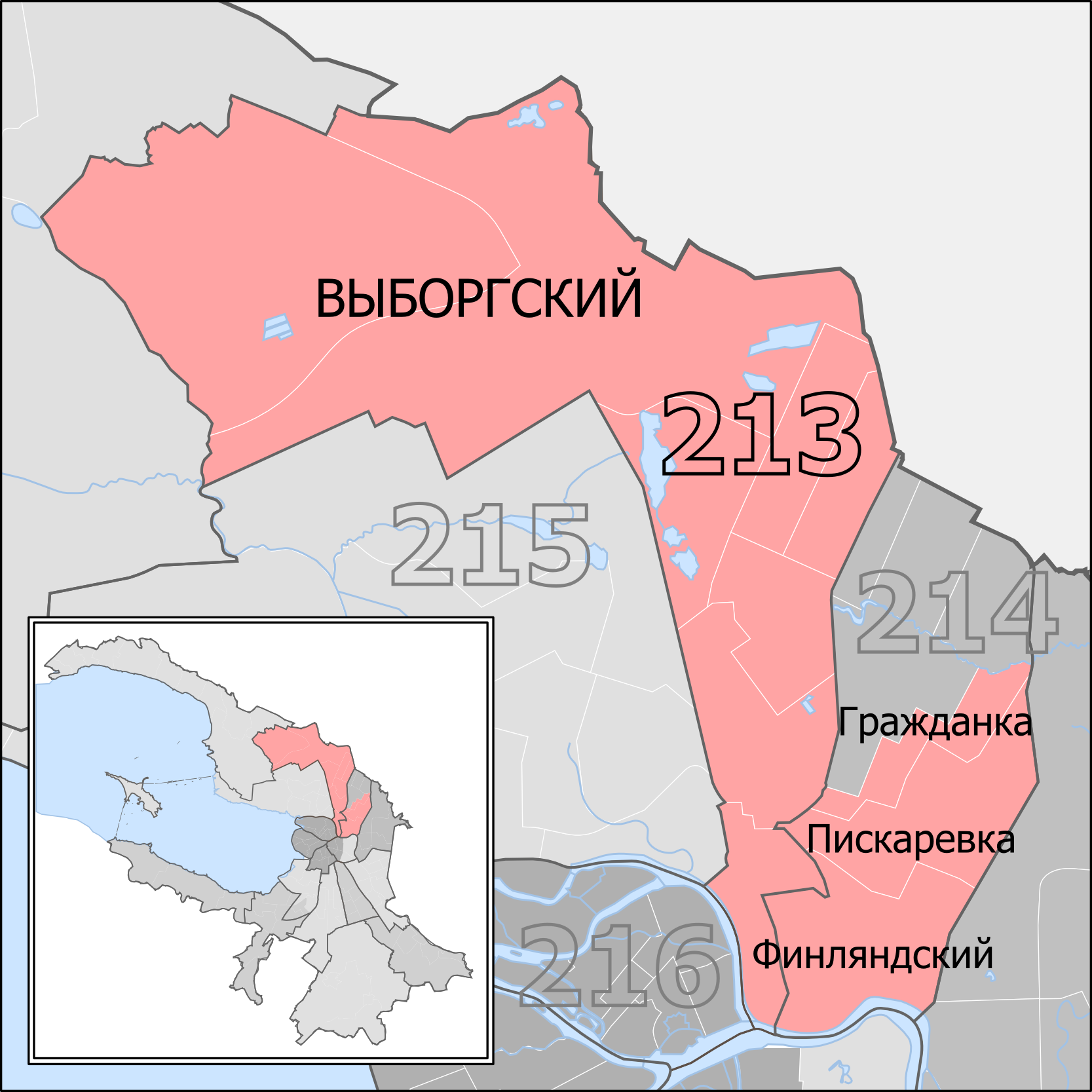
Constituency boundaries from 2016 to 2026

2016–2026: Kalininsky District (Finlyandsky, Grazhdanka, Piskaryovka), Vyborgsky District
The constituency was re-created for the 2016 election and retained part of its former territory, losing its former portion of northern Kalininsky District to North-Eastern constituency. This seat instead gained the rest of Vyborgsky District from North-Western constituency as well as Finlyandsky, Grazhdanka and Piskaryovka in Kalininsky District from Central constituency.

2026–present: Kalininsky District (Akademicheskoye, Grazhdanka), Petrogradsky District, Tsentralny District (Liteyny, Smolninskoye), Vyborgsky District (Sampsoniyevskoye, Svetlanovskoye, Shuvalovo-Ozerki, Levashovo, Pargolovo)
The constituency was significantly changed following the 2025 redistricting as it retained most of Vyborgsky District and Grazhdanka municipal okrug, losing residential north-eastern Vyborgsky District, Finlyandsky and Piskaryovka municipal okrugs to North-Western constituency. This seat instead was pushed southwards into downtown Saint Petersburg, gaining Petrogradsky District and Liteyny Municipal Okrug from Central constituency as well as Smolninskoye Municipal Okrug from Eastern constituency.

== Members elected ==
Election	Member	Party
1993	Mikhail Kiselyov	Independent
1995	Galina Starovoytova (Note: assassinated in November 1998)	Independent
1999	Sergey Stepashin (Note: appointed Chairman of the Accounts Chamber of Russia in April 2000)	Yabloko
2003	Gennady Seleznyov	Party of Russia's Rebirth-Russian Party of Life
2007	Proportional representation - no election by constituency	
2011	Proportional representation - no election by constituency	
2016	Yevgeny Marchenko	United Russia
2021	Yevgeny Marchenko	United Russia
2026	Irina Ivanova	Communist Party

== Election results ==
=== 1993 ===
Summary of the 12 December 1993 Russian legislative election in the Northern constituency
Candidate	Party	Votes	%
Mikhail Kiselyov	Independent	21,569	8.02%
Valery Selivanov	Independent	16,882	6.28%
Georgy Glagovsky	Independent	16,680	6.20%
Yury Belov	Communist Party	16,313	6.06%
Aleksey Liverovsky	Independent	15,342	5.70%
Sergey Bogatov	Independent	14,384	5.35%
Aleksandr Sungurov	Choice of Russia	13,808	5.13%
Viktor Drozdov	Yavlinky–Boldyrev–Lukin	12,707	4.72%
Yury Novolodsky	Independent	12,666	4.71%
Valery Yurchenko	Independent	10,194	3.79%
Nikolay Bondarik	Independent	9,417	3.50%
Gennady Turetsky	Independent	8,896	3.31%
Andrey Murashov	Russian Democratic Reform Movement	8,086	3.01%
Ivan Smirnov	Independent	7,764	2.89%
Yevgeny Tuinov	Liberal Democratic Party	7,391	2.75%
Terenty Zubik	Party of Russian Unity and Accord	7,170	2.67%
Vladimir Derbin	Independent	4,536	1.69%
Vladimir Khodyachenko	Democratic Party	1,838	0.68%
Viktor Linchenko	Independent	1,236	0.46%
Gennady Tereshchenko	Civic Union	1,031	0.38%
against all		41,433	15.40%
Total		269,019	100%

=== 1995 ===
Summary of the 17 December 1995 Russian legislative election in the Northern constituency
Candidate	Party	Votes	%
Galina Starovoytova	Independent	36,677	13.12%
Viktor Talanov	Stanislav Govorukhin Bloc	28,897	10.34%
Viktor Volodkin	Yabloko	27,737	9.92%
Yury Derevyanko	Democratic Choice of Russia – United Democrats	27,175	9.72%
Yury Terentyev	Communists and Working Russia - for the Soviet Union	24,982	8.94%
Igor Ignatyev	Independent	23,557	8.43%
Valery Selivanov	Independent	16,565	5.93%
Yury Yefimov	Independent	11,091	3.97%
Lev Konstantinov·	Independent	10,417	3.73%
Viktor Kirilenko	Independent	5,540	1.98%
Sergey Bodrov	Liberal Democratic Party	4,987	1.78%
Boris Vasilyev	Independent	4,885	1.75%
Viktor Kovalev	Independent	3,968	1.42%
Viktor Drozdov	Pamfilova–Gurov–Lysenko	3,506	1.25%
Andrey Devyatkin	Independent	3,471	1.24%
Dmitry Astakhov	Forward, Russia!	3,405	1.22%
Aleksandr Diomidovsky	Independent	2,513	0.90%
Sergey Volodenkov	Transformation of the Fatherland	1,453	0.52%
Boris Shestopalov	Independent	1,425	0.51%
Viktor Makarov	Independent	1,233	0.44%
Valery Yurchenko	Union of Patriots	944	0.34%
Nikolay Fuga	Independent	880	0.31%
Valery Khotyanovich	Independent	707	0.25%
Sergey Rudasev	Party of Russian Unity and Accord	597	0.21%
against all		26,160	9.36%
Total		279,508	100%

=== 1999 ===
Summary of the 19 December 1999 Russian legislative election in the Northern constituency
Candidate	Party	Votes	%
Sergey Stepashin	Yabloko	120,161	49.41%
Aleksey Vorontsov	Independent	36,797	15.13%
Anna Chesnokova	Fatherland – All Russia	23,895	9.83%
Nikolay Bondarik	Independent	14,797	6.08%
Yakov Nakatis	Our Home – Russia	4,733	1.95%
Valery Abakumov	Spiritual Heritage	2,813	1.16%
Andrey Devyatkin	Independent	1,925	0.79%
Eduard Sergeyev	Independent	1,547	0.64%
Valery Fedosenko	Independent	1,386	0.57%
Lev Nechipurenko	Independent	717	0.29%
against all		32,197	13.24%
Total		243,179	100%

=== 2000 ===
The results of the by-election were annulled due to low turnout (18.71%).

Summary of the 15 October 2000 by-election in the Northern constituency
Candidate	Party	Votes	%
Yury Savelyev	Independent	29,902	36.79%
Natalya Petukhova	Development of Enterprise	21,240	26.13%
Anatoly Golov	Independent	13,781	16.95%
Yury Shutov	Independent	4,851	5.97%
Sergey Andreyev	Independent	3,423	4.21%
Ruslan Linkov	Independent	2,487	3.06%
Anna Chesnokova	Independent	981	1.21%
Nikolay Bondarik	Independent	383	0.47%
Vyacheslav Marychev	Independent	307	0.38%
Valery Fedosenko	Independent	220	0.27%
Mikhail Zhivilo	Independent	49	0.06%
Yury Zhivilo	Independent	29	0.04%
against all		3,203	3.94%
Total		81,281	100%

=== 2001 ===
The results of the by-election were annulled due to low turnout (22.49%).

Summary of the 14 October 2001 by-election in the Northern constituency
Candidate	Party	Votes	%
Yury Savelyev	Independent	44,153	45.52%
Natalya Petukhova	Development of Enterprise	24,583	25.34%
Yury Solonin	Independent	21,022	21.67%
Yevgeny Faleyev	Independent	653	0.67%
Vladimir Dolgov	Independent	564	0.58%
Aleksandr Bakayev	Independent	512	0.53%
Vardkes Khachaturov	Independent	132	0.14%
against all		4,776	4.92%
Total		97,004	100%

=== 2003 ===
Summary of the 7 December 2003 Russian legislative election in the Northern constituency
Candidate	Party	Votes	%
Gennady Seleznyov	Party of Russia's Rebirth-Russian Party of Life	100,326	46.93%
Irina Khakamada	Union of Right Forces	45,118	21.11%
Yelena Tabakova	Independent	15,496	7.25%
Aleksandr Krauze	Communist Party	12,437	5.82%
Yelena Babich	Liberal Democratic Party	6,616	3.10%
Sergey Sidorin	Independent	4,248	1.99%
Viktor Govyadovsky	Independent	3,052	1.43%
against all		24,301	11.37%
Total		214,069	100%

=== 2016 ===
Summary of the 18 September 2016 Russian legislative election in the Northern constituency
Candidate	Party	Votes	%
Yevgeny Marchenko	United Russia	59,534	36.54%
Sergey Panteleyev	Communist Party	16,999	10.43%
Georgy Glagovsky	Yabloko	16,578	10.17%
Natalya Greys	A Just Russia	15,198	9.33%
Oleg Kapitanov	Liberal Democratic Party	14,744	9.05%
Natalya Petukhova	Party of Growth	14,025	8.61%
Natalya Gryaznevich	People's Freedom Party	6,185	3.80%
Andrey Kochergin	Rodina	5,383	3.30%
Aleksandr Sakharov	Communists of Russia	4,006	2.46%
Konstantin Bulgakov	Civilian Power	1,774	1.09%
Aleksandr Fomishin	Civic Platform	988	0.61%
Igor Kuznik	Patriots of Russia	939	0.58%
Total		162,941	100%

=== 2021 ===
Summary of the 17-19 September 2021 Russian legislative election in the Northern constituency
Candidate	Party	Votes	%
Yevgeny Marchenko (incumbent)	United Russia	67,162	34.18%
Irina Ivanova	Communist Party	48,036	24.45%
Grigory Tochilnikov	A Just Russia — For Truth	19,681	10.02%
Nikolay Gromov	Yabloko	13,732	6.99%
Ilya Leshchev	New People	13,486	6.86%
Natalya Antyukh	Party of Pensioners	9,425	4.80%
Stanislav Ivanov	Liberal Democratic Party	7,328	3.73%
Anna Zvereva	Green Alternative	3,087	1.57%
Sergey Sibiryakov	The Greens	2,732	1.39%
Andrey Shpilenko	Rodina	2,471	1.26%
Sergey Romanovsky	Civic Platform	1,795	0.91%
Total		196,467	100%

=== 2026 ===
Summary of the 18-20 September 2026 Russian legislative election in the Northern constituency
Candidate	Party	Votes	%
Irina Ivanova	Communist Party	124,708	44.97%
Vsevolod Belikov	United Russia	71,423	25.76%
Dmitry Gintovt	New People	31,071	11.21%
Mikhail Amosov	The Greens	20,263	7.31%
Artyom Zverev	Liberal Democratic Party	20,150	7.27%
Vladimir Matyagin	A Just Russia	5,625	2.03%
Total		277,287	100%
