= Liteyny =

Liteyny (Russian: Лите́йный) may refer to:

- Liteyny Avenue, Saint Petersburg, Russia
- Liteyny Bridge, Saint Petersburg, Russia
- Liteyny Municipal Okrug, Saint Petersburg, Russia
- Liteyny Theatre, Saint Petersburg, Russia
