= North-Western constituency (Saint Petersburg) =

North-Western single-member constituency
- Constituency of the Russian State Duma
- Deputy: Nikolay Tsed; United Russia
- Federal subject: Saint Petersburg
- Districts: Kurortny, Primorsky
- Voters: 514,791 (2026)

The North-Western constituency (No.215 (Note: No.209 in 1993-1995, No.210 in 1995-2007)) is a Russian legislative constituency in Saint Petersburg. The constituency covers upscale north-western Saint Petersburg and its inner suburbs.

The constituency has been represented since 2021 by United Russia deputy Nikolay Tsed, former Head of Primorsky District, who won the open seat, succeeding one-term United Russia incumbent Vladimir Katenev.

== Boundaries ==
1993–1995: Kronshtadt, Petrogradsky District, Primorsky District, Sestroretsky District, Zelenogorsky District
The constituency covered upscale north-western Saint Petersburg, including historic Petrogradsky District in the downtown, inner suburbs, satellite cities Sestroretsk and Zelenogorsk as well as Kronshtadt on the Kotlin Island.

1995–2003: Kronshtadt, Kurortny District, Primorsky District, Vyborgsky District (part of Sosnovskoye, Parnas, Shuvalovo-Ozerki, Levashovo, Pargolovo)
Following the 1995 redistricting the constituency was significantly changed, losing Petrogradsky District to Central constituency. This seat instead gained outer northern Vyborgsky District from Northern constituency.

2003–2007: Kronshtadt, Kurortny District, Primorsky District, Vyborgsky District (Shuvalovo-Ozerki, Levashovo, Pargolovo)
After the 2003 redistricting the constituency was slightly altered, losing its portion of Sosnovskoye and Parnas in Vyborgsky District to Northern constituency.

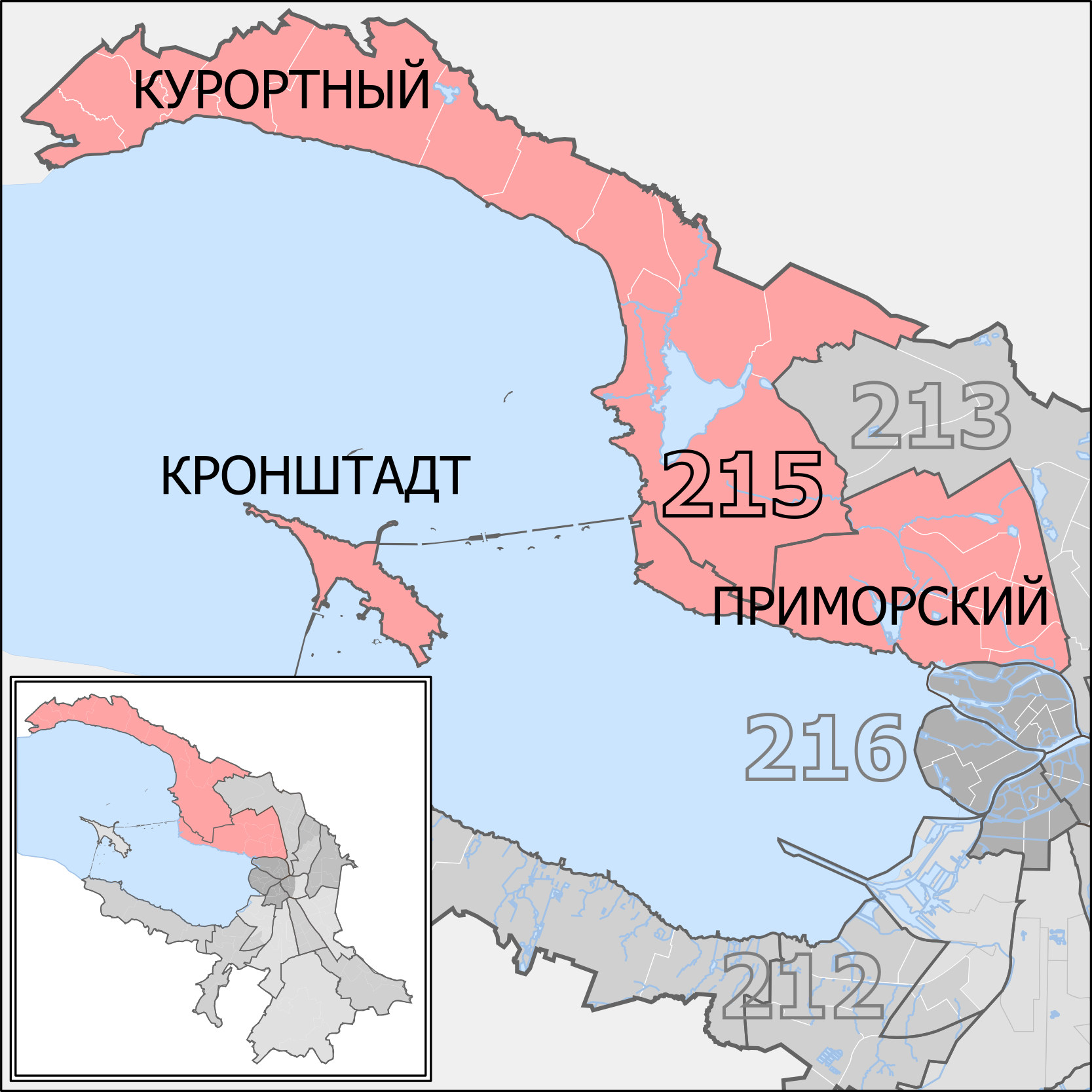
Constituency boundaries from 2016 to 2026

2016–2026: Kronshtadtsky District, Kurortny District, Primorsky District
The constituency was re-created for the 2016 election and retained most of its former territory, losing only its portion of Vyborgsky District to Northern constituency.

2026–present: Kurortny District, Primorsky District
The constituency was changed following the 2025 redistricting, losing Kronshtadt to Western constituency.

== Members elected ==
Election	Member	Party
1993	Aleksey Aleksandrov	Independent
1995	Anatoly Golov	Yabloko
1999	A by-election was scheduled after Against all line received the most votes	
2000	Konstantin Sevenard	Independent
2003	Andrey Shevelyov	United Russia
2007	Proportional representation - no election by constituency	
2011	Proportional representation - no election by constituency	
2016	Vladimir Katenev	United Russia
2021	Nikolay Tsed	United Russia
2026	Nikolay Tsed	United Russia

== Election results ==
=== 1993 ===
Summary of the 12 December 1993 Russian legislative election in the North-Western constituency
Candidate	Party	Votes	%
Aleksey Aleksandrov	Independent	40,269	18.21%
Vatanyar Yagya	Independent	–	8.84%
Mikhail Amosov	Yavlinky–Boldyrev–Lukin	–	–
Vitaly Kalinin	Party of Russian Unity and Accord	–	–
Valery Karmanovsky	Independent	–	–
Aleksandr Kutenev	Russian Democratic Reform Movement	–	–
Boris Onegin	Independent	–	–
Aleksandr Rudenko	Independent	–	–
Konstantin Ryabchikhin	Independent	–	–
Anatoly Shesteryuk	Independent	–	–
Sergey Tsvetkov	Independent	–	–
Sergey Yegorov	Independent	–	–
Total		221,178	100%

=== 1995 ===
Summary of the 17 December 1995 Russian legislative election in the North-Western constituency
Candidate	Party	Votes	%
Anatoly Golov	Yabloko	41,198	13.99%
Vyacheslav Shcherbakov	Ivan Rybkin Bloc	34,931	11.86%
Grigory Tomchin	Democratic Choice of Russia – United Democrats	34,286	11.64%
Aleksey Aleksandrov (incumbent)	Our Home – Russia	33,559	11.40%
Sergey Savchenko	Communists and Working Russia - for the Soviet Union	32,057	10.89%
Anatoly Krivenchenko	Congress of Russian Communities	21,309	7.24%
Viktor Sokolov	Party of Workers' Self-Government	10,837	3.68%
Yelena Babich	Liberal Democratic Party	8,779	2.98%
Aleksandr Makarov	Independent	7,297	2.48%
Nadezhda Pashkovskaya	Forward, Russia!	6,610	2.24%
Valery Pankratov	Independent	6,574	2.23%
Sergey Tsvetkov	Trade Unions and Industrialists – Union of Labour	6,403	2.17%
Aleksandr Shanurenko	Pamfilova–Gurov–Lysenko	4,685	1.59%
Aleksandr Dugin	Independent	2,493	0.85%
Vyacheslav Chernyshev	Independent	2,068	0.70%
Yevgeny Zaytsev	Independent	907	0.31%
Aleksandr Deyanov	Transformation of the Fatherland	835	0.28%
against all		33,361	11.33%
Total		294,495	100%

=== 1999 ===
A by-election was scheduled after Against all line received the most votes.

Summary of the 19 December 1999 Russian legislative election in the North-Western constituency
Candidate	Party	Votes	%
Anatoly Golov (incumbent)	Yabloko	40,595	14.77%
Aleksandr Neshitov	Fatherland – All Russia	37,496	13.64%
Konstantin Sevenard	Independent	37,361	13.59%
Yury Shuvalov	Union of Right Forces	32,372	11.78%
Mikhail Boyarsky	Independent	25,898	9.42%
Vladimir Prudnikov	Congress of Russian Communities-Yury Boldyrev Movement	16,109	5.86%
Yevgeny Nikolsky	Independent	11,343	4.13%
Sergey Kolesnik	Independent	7,233	2.63%
Yury Zheludkov	Liberal Democratic Party	4,773	1.74%
Boris Vasilyev	Russian Socialist Party	4,743	1.73%
Lyudmila Poddubskaya	Independent	4,371	1.59%
Viktor Sokolov	Independent	3,262	1.19%
Andrey Stepanov	Our Home – Russia	2,648	0.96%
Yury Nikolayenko	Spiritual Heritage	1,452	0.53%
against all		42,450	15.44%
Total		274,893	100%

=== 2000 ===
Summary of the 26 March 2000 by-election in the North-Western constituency
Candidate	Party	Votes	%
Konstantin Sevenard	Independent	73,473	21.39%
Anatoly Golov	Independent	69,541	20.25%
Said Tulakov	Independent	43,114	12.55%
Aleksey Vorontsov	Independent	28,956	8.43%
Aleksandr Neshitov	Independent	12,244	3.56%
Olga Borisova	Independent	10,521	3.06%
Yury Shutov	Independent	6,590	1.92%
Natalya Belotskaya	Independent	4,731	1.38%
Anatoly Kontashev	Independent	3,529	1.03%
Aleksandr Tsvetkov	Independent	2,670	0.78%
Valery Nitetsky	Independent	2,485	0.72%
Vladimir Savitsky	Independent	2,475	0.72%
Andrey Rozhdestvensky	Independent	2,435	0.71%
Viktor Makarov	Independent	1,925	0.56%
Lyudmila Bespalova	Independent	1,912	0.56%
Teymuraz Avaliani	Independent	1,903	0.55%
Yury Abanin	Independent	1,537	0.45%
Yevgeny Pudovkin	Independent	1,508	0.44%
Yevgeny Zverev	Independent	1,466	0.43%
Nikolay Bondarik	Independent	1,457	0.42%
Vyacheslav Marychev	Independent	1,182	0.34%
Vasily Terentyev	Independent	924	0.27%
Viktor Gladkikh	Independent	504	0.15%
Andrey Melnichuk	Independent	421	0.12%
Aleksandr Bakayev	Independent	366	0.11%
against all		59,234	17.25%
Total		343,483	100%

=== 2003 ===
Summary of the 7 December 2003 Russian legislative election in the North-Western constituency
Candidate	Party	Votes	%
Andrey Shevelyov	United Russia	39,442	19.19%
Anatoly Krivenchenko	Rodina	30,977	15.07%
Anatoly Golov	Yabloko	28,608	13.92%
Sergey Gulyayev	Union of Right Forces	22,614	11.01%
Georgy Alyev	Independent	16,776	8.16%
Pavel Dashkov	Independent	13,256	6.45%
Sergey Vostretsov	Party of Russia's Rebirth-Russian Party of Life	7,040	3.43%
Taras Komissarov	Liberal Democratic Party	5,836	2.84%
Igor Morozov	Independent	3,243	1.58%
Vladimir Romantsov	Independent	2,849	1.39%
Sergey Pryanishnikov	Independent	2,415	1.18%
Vladimir Kirkin	United Russian Party Rus'	1,251	0.61%
against all		29,315	14.27%
Total		205,866	100%

=== 2016 ===
Summary of the 18 September 2016 Russian legislative election in the North-Western constituency
Candidate	Party	Votes	%
Vladimir Katenev	United Russia	45,790	29.53%
Oleg Nilov	A Just Russia	28,426	18.33%
Irina Ivanova	Communist Party	17,408	11.23%
Anatoly Golov	Yabloko	16,728	10.79%
Oleg Lavrov	Liberal Democratic Party	13,676	8.82%
Andrey Krutov	Party of Growth	11,793	7.61%
Oleg Maksakov	People's Freedom Party	3,901	2.52%
Aleksandr Novikov	The Greens	3,819	2.46%
Mikhail Starodubtsev	Patriots of Russia	2,895	1.87%
Aleksandr Privalov	Communists of Russia	2,795	1.80%
Olga Popova	Civic Platform	1,993	1.29%
Total		155,037	100%

=== 2021 ===
Summary of the 17-19 September 2021 Russian legislative election in the North-Western constituency
Candidate	Party	Votes	%
Nikolay Tsed	United Russia	64,816	33.34%
Oleg Nilov	A Just Russia — For Truth	45,964	23.64%
Vyacheslav Borodenchik	Communist Party	18,390	9.46%
Diana Ageyeva	New People	11,243	5.78%
Olga Yakovleva	Party of Growth	7,970	4.10%
Stanislav Andrusov	Party of Pensioners	7,509	3.86%
Aleksey Gorlanov	Liberal Democratic Party	7,370	3.79%
Yury Karpenko	Yabloko	7,342	3.78%
Veronika Klinovitskaya	Communists of Russia	5,609	2.89%
Vsevolod Kuptsov	Russian Party of Freedom and Justice	3,491	1.80%
Aleksandr Kolos	Rodina	3,315	1.71%
Sergey Soloshenko	Green Alternative	3,283	1.69%
Igor Markov	Civic Platform	1,795	0.92%
Total		194,400	100%

=== 2026 ===
Summary of the 18-20 September 2026 Russian legislative election in the North-Western constituency
Candidate	Party	Votes	%
Nikolay Tsed (incumbent)	United Russia	155,753	56.95%
Anton Pykhteyev	Liberal Democratic Party	31,534	11.53%
Viktoria Bykova	New People	29,945	10.95%
Vyacheslav Borodenchik	Communist Party	27,355	10.00%
Denis Shchebetov	The Greens	12,831	4.69%
Olga Yurkevich	Yabloko	6,674	2.44%
Valery Tatarov	A Just Russia	5,956	2.18%
Total		273,474	100%
