= Nikolay Tsed =

Russian politician

Nikolay Tsed MP
- Николай Цед
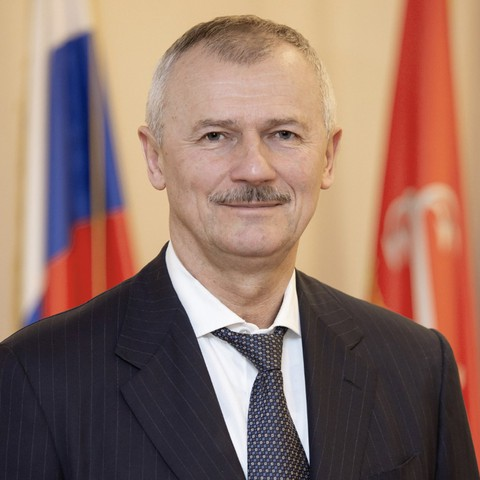

Member of the State Duma for Saint Petersburg
- Incumbent
- Assumed office 12 October 2021
- Preceded by: Vladimir Katenev
- Constituency: Northwest St. Petersburg (No. 215)

Personal details
- Born: 6 October 1959 (age 66) Ozery, Babruysk District, Byelorussian SSR, USSR
- Party: United Russia
- Education: Military Institute of Physical Culture

Nikolay Grigorievich Tsed (Russian: Николай Григорьевич Цед; born 10 October 10, 1959, Ozery, Babruysk District) is a Russian political figure, deputy of the 8th State Duma.

Tsed worked as a researcher at the Military Institute of Physical Culture. Later, he started working at the Lesgaft National State University of Physical Education, Sport and Health. From 1994 to 1997, Tsed was the coach of the Saint Petersburg hand-to-hand combat team. From 2010 to 2012, Tsed was the Deputy Governor of the Kostroma Oblast Igor Albin. On April 23, 2013, Tsed was appointed the Head of the Administration of the Primorsky District. Since September 2021, he has served as deputy of the 8th State Duma.

== Sanctions ==
He was sanctioned by the UK government in 2022 in relation to the Russo-Ukrainian War.
