= Yevgeny Marchenko (politician) =

Russian politician

Yevgeny Marchenko MP
- Евгений Марченко
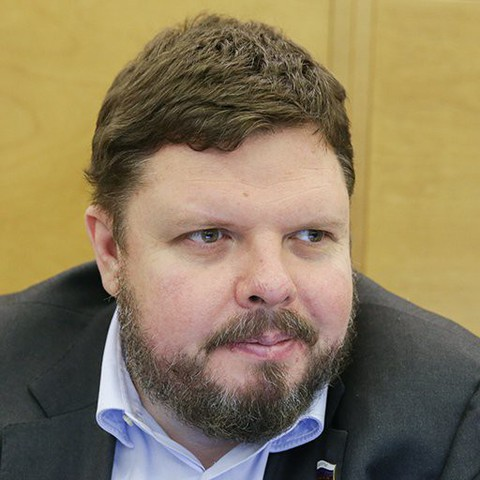

Member of the State Duma for Saint Petersburg
- Incumbent
- Assumed office 5 October 2016
- Preceded by: constituency re-established
- Constituency: Northern St. Petersburg (No. 213)

Personal details
- Born: 17 July 1972 (age 54) Penza, Russian SFSR, USSR
- Party: United Russia (expelled November 2021); Independent
- Education: Nakhimov Naval School

Yevgeny Yevgenievich Marchenko (Note: Also transliterated Evgeny Evgenievich Marchenko.) (Russian: Евгений Евгеньевич Марченко; born 17 July 1972, Penza) is a Russian political figure and a deputy of the 7th and 8th State Dumas.

From 1998 to 2002, Marchenko was the chairman of the public organization Association of Young Lawyers. In 2004–2007, he was the chief specialist of the permanent commission on the structure of state power, local self-government and the administrative-territorial structure of the Legislative Assembly of Saint Petersburg. On 14 March 2004 he was elected deputy of the Municipal Council of St. Petersburg. On 11 March 2007, Marchenko was elected deputy of the Legislative Assembly of Saint Petersburg of the 4th convocation. On 24 May 2013 he again received a mandate for the Legislative Assembly of Saint Petersburg where he suggested initiatives to ban nightclubs, cancel mass events to celebrate the New Year due to the threat of terrorist attacks, to increase criminal liability for crimes committed by foreigners, to ban the sale of alcohol at night in public places. On 18 March 2016 he was elected deputy of the 7th State Duma. Since September 2021, he has served as deputy of the 8th State Duma from the Saint Petersburg constituency.

In 2015, Marchenko defended his MA dissertation at the History department of the Saint Petersburg State University. A year later, journalists of the Novaya Gazeta found out that the originality level of the work is only 28%.

On 11 November 2021 Marchenko was excluded from the United Russia as he voted against the draft budget adopted in the first reading on 28 October 2021, despite the decision of the United Russia faction to unanimously support the document. According to the party representatives, Marchenko thus violated the norms of the charter and the provision on the faction.
