= Oleg Nilov =

Russian politician, Member of the State Duma

Oleg Nilov MP
- Олег Нилов
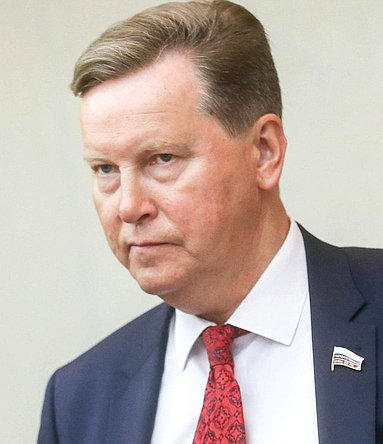

Member of the State Duma (Party List Seat)
- Incumbent
- Assumed office 21 December 2011

Personal details
- Born: 8 May 1962 (age 62); Yasnoye, Slavsky District, Kaliningrad Oblast, Russian SFSR, Soviet Union
- Political party: A Just Russia - For Truth
- Education: Leningrad Institute of Aviation Instrumentation; RANEPA; RANEPA; St. Petersburg State University

Oleg Anatolyevich Nilov (Russian: Олег Анатольевич Нилов; b. May 8, 1962, Kaliningrad Oblast) is a Russian politician and member of the State Duma of the Russian Federation (since 2011), deputy head of the fraction of the A Just Russia party.

== Biography ==
In 1985, he graduated from the Saint Petersburg State University of Aerospace Instrumentation. He worked at a plant and was a Komsomol member.

In 1999, he graduated from the Russian Presidential Academy of National Economy and Public Administration and in 2004 from the Saint Petersburg State University.

In 2014 he received a Russian Federation Presidential Certificate of Honour.

=== Sanctions ===
On 24 March 2022, the United States Treasury sanctioned him in response to the 2022 Russian invasion of Ukraine.

He was sanctioned by the UK government in 2022 in relation to the Russo-Ukrainian War.

== Controversies ==
In December 2022, during the charity event at the State Duma, where participants were supposed to fulfill a child's New Year's wish written on a card they select from a tree, Nilov made a comment regarding the Russian invasion of Ukraine. A video of the event showed Nilov saying: "The boy Vova from Kiev dreams of rockets. Vova, you will get missiles. This is a joke, of course." His comment was met with criticism, and Artem Metelev, the chairman of the State Duma Committee on Youth Policy, was seen covering his face with his hand in response.

In April 2023, Nilov proposed a "military tax" of 2-3% on individuals to support the Russian army in the conflict with Ukraine.
