= Sampsoniyevskoye Municipal Okrug =

Sampsoniyevskoye Municipal Okrug Муниципальное образование муниципальный округ Сампсониевское (Russian)
- District
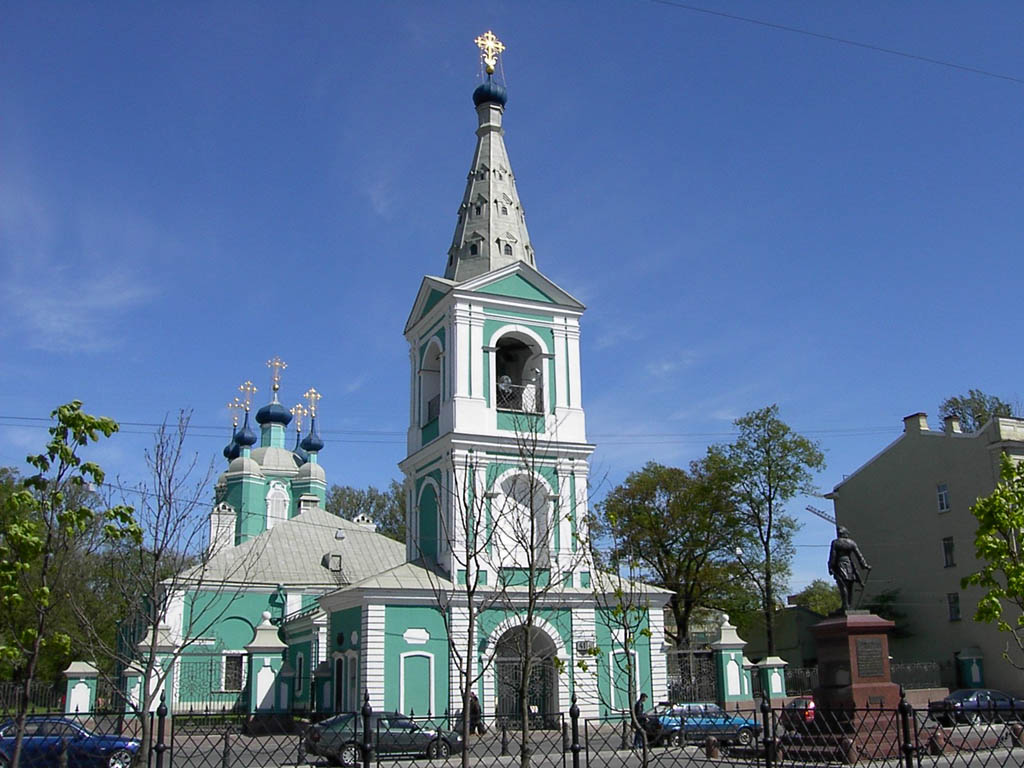
- Saint Sampson the Hospitable's Cathedral and its belfry

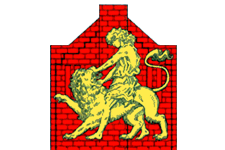
- Flag

- Map of Saint Petersburg with Sampsoniyevskiy okrug highlighted in red
- Coordinates: 59°59′24″N 30°19′55″E
- Country: Russia
- Federal subject: Saint Petersburg
- Established: 1998

Area
  - Total: 4.9 km^{2} (1.9 sq mi)
- Time zone: UTC+
- OKTMO ID: 40314000
- Website: http://www.mo-12.ru/

Sampsoniyevskoye (Russian: Сампсониевское) is a municipal okrug occupying the southern part of Vyborgsky District of the federal city of Saint Petersburg, Russia.

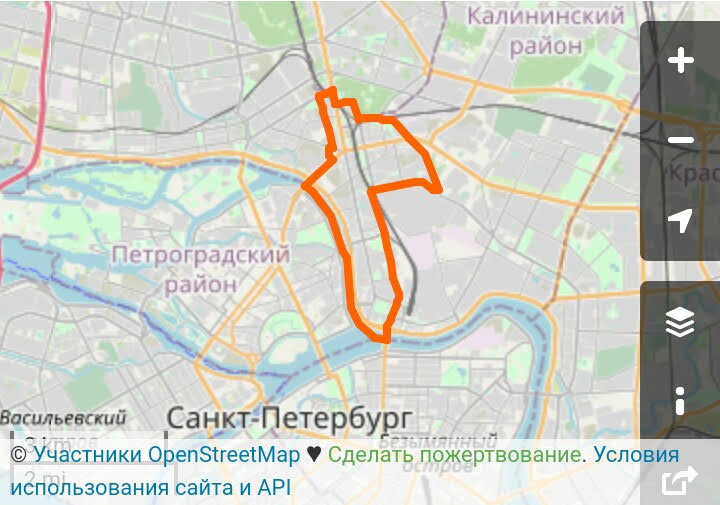
Sampsonievskoe municipal okrug border map from openstreetmap

Since the 18th century until virtually the 21st century it was a primary industrial area of the city, built up with factories and apartment buildings for their workforce, while in post-Soviet times a number of industrial plants have been closed down or relocated and their premises and / or land redeveloped. Large grounds in the southwest from the Neva embankment Inland have long been used by the campus of the Military Medical Academy, and northwards there are two other specialized learning facilities - the campuses of Military Institute of Physical Culture and of Saint Petersburg State Pediatric Medical University. Beyond the northern boundarynd of the municipality since the early 19th century in the grounds of the former Alexander Davidson's English Farm has been working Russia's higher school of forestry, now Saint Petersburg Forestry Technical University, whose buildings are scattered around a large botanical garden park. To its south, within the okrug, over a block of streets there are buildings of dormitories for students mostly of Saint Petersburg Polytechnic University. The area is washed from the south by the Neva River, and from the west by its arm the Great Nevka River.

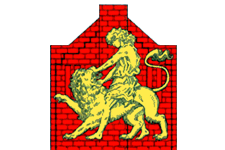
Flag of Sampsonievskoe (St Petersburg) depicting the biblical Samson tearing up the lion that attacked him. The red brick wall in the background is typical of the 19th-century factories' architecture of the area.

== Location and history ==
The district and okrug inventory and boundaries were defined by the Act of Saint Petersburg on Territorial Division of Saint Petersburg of 2005 (subsequently updated):

2.3.1. Description of the boundaries of the municipal district Sampsonievskoe

The border passes:

from the Kantemirovsky Bridge in the south along the axis of the Bolshaya Nevka River to the Neva River, then along the axis of the Neva River to the Liteyny Bridge, then along the axis of Academician Lebedev Street to Lesnoy Prospekt, further along the axis of Lesnoy Prospekt to Litovskaya Street, then along the axis of Litovskaya Street to Polyustrovsky Prospekt, then along the axis of Polyustrovsky Prospekt to Karbyshev Street, then along the axis of Karbyshev Street to the north side of the right-of-way strip of the Ladoga railway direction, further along the north side of the right-of-way line of the Ladoga railway direction to the north on the other side of the Kushelevka - Lanskaya railway line, further along the northern side of the Kushelevka-Lanskaya railway line, to Lesnoy prospekt, then along the axis of Lesnoy prospekt to Institutsky lane, then along the axis of Institutsky lane to Bolshoy Sampsonievsky prospekt, then along the axis of the Bolshoy Sampsonievsky prospekt to Serdobolskaya street, then along the axis of Serdobolskaya street to Studencheskaya Street, then along the axis of Studencheskaya street to Beloostrovskaya street, then 40 m to the north-west along the axis of Beloostrovskaya Street to the western border of the territory of the Rainbow enterprise, then along the western border of the territory of the Rsduga enterprise to Kantemirovskaya Street, then along the axis of the Kantemirovskaya street to the river axis of the Big Nevka.

Together with the whole district, the okrug is centered around the southern part of the old road from Saint Petersburg to Vyborg, a borderline city that was founded by Sweden, but was taken by the Russian Army for the first time during the Great Northern War fought in the first quarter of the 18th century. That war has been commemorated in the okrug land: the decisive Russian victory in the Battle of Poltava falling on the feast day of Saint Sampson the Hospitable, St Sampson's church and later the present cathedral were built, and several streets were given the Swedish names of cities and towns in Finland. The southern part of the thoroughfare was named Bolshoy Sampsoniyevskiy prospect (the Greater Avenue of [Saint] Sampson), and when in post-Soviet times municipal okrugs were laid out within pre-existing city districts, this okrug was given Sampson's name as well. The okrug's arms show his namesake - an Old Testament hero Samson, whose figure shown tearing open the mouth of the lion that attacked him was in the 18th century used as a rhetorical symbol of Russian victory over the Swedish empire epitomised in his golden statue in the center of Peterhof palace fountain park. A new connection with Sweden was established by the entrepreneurial family of Nobel in the second half of the 19th century, who built a factory and living quarters in the territory. Apartment buildings for families of local factories' workforce were often erected in late 1920s and first half of 1930s in Constructivism style.

== Landmarks ==
=== Military Medical Academy ===
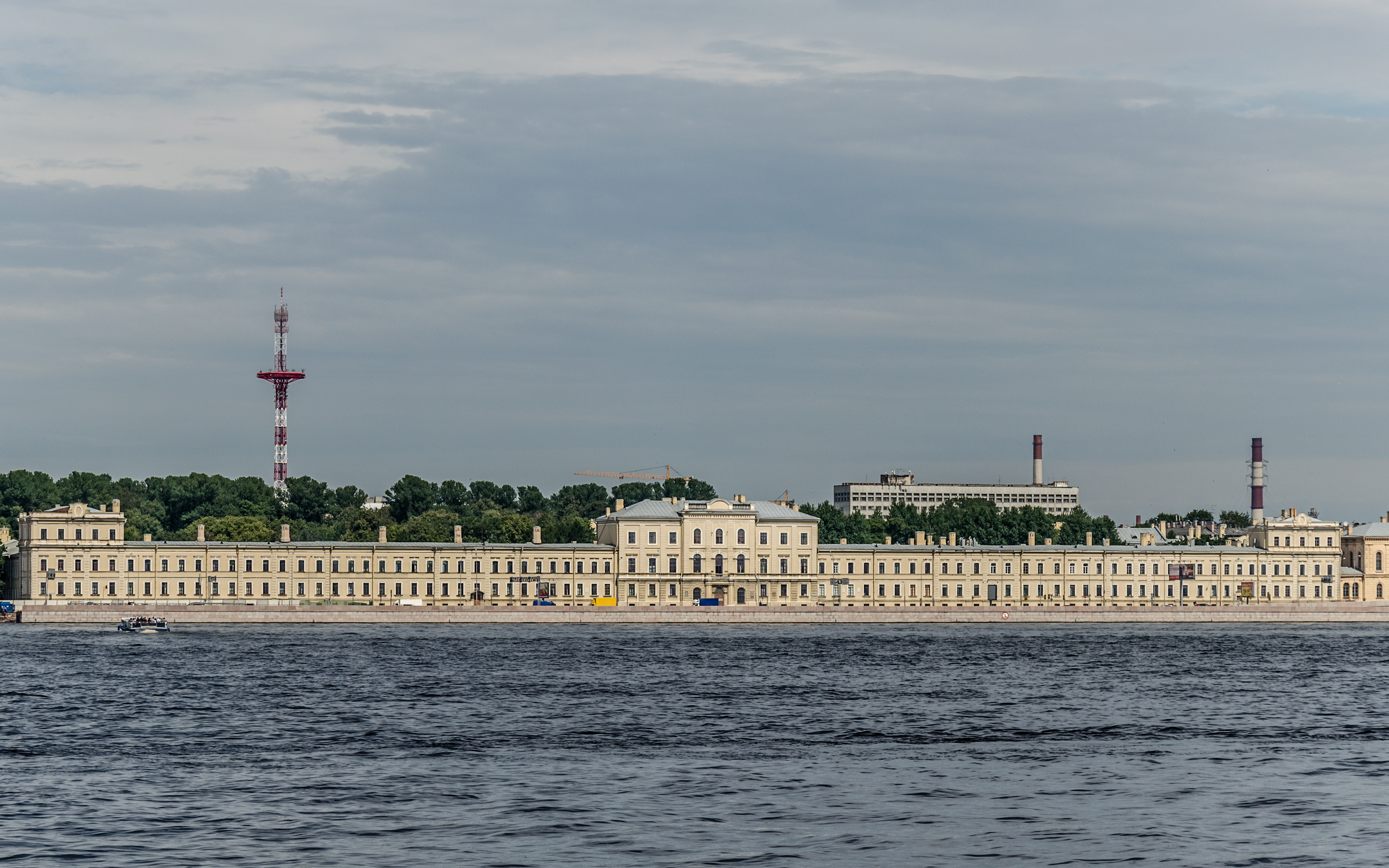
Front along the Neva embankment

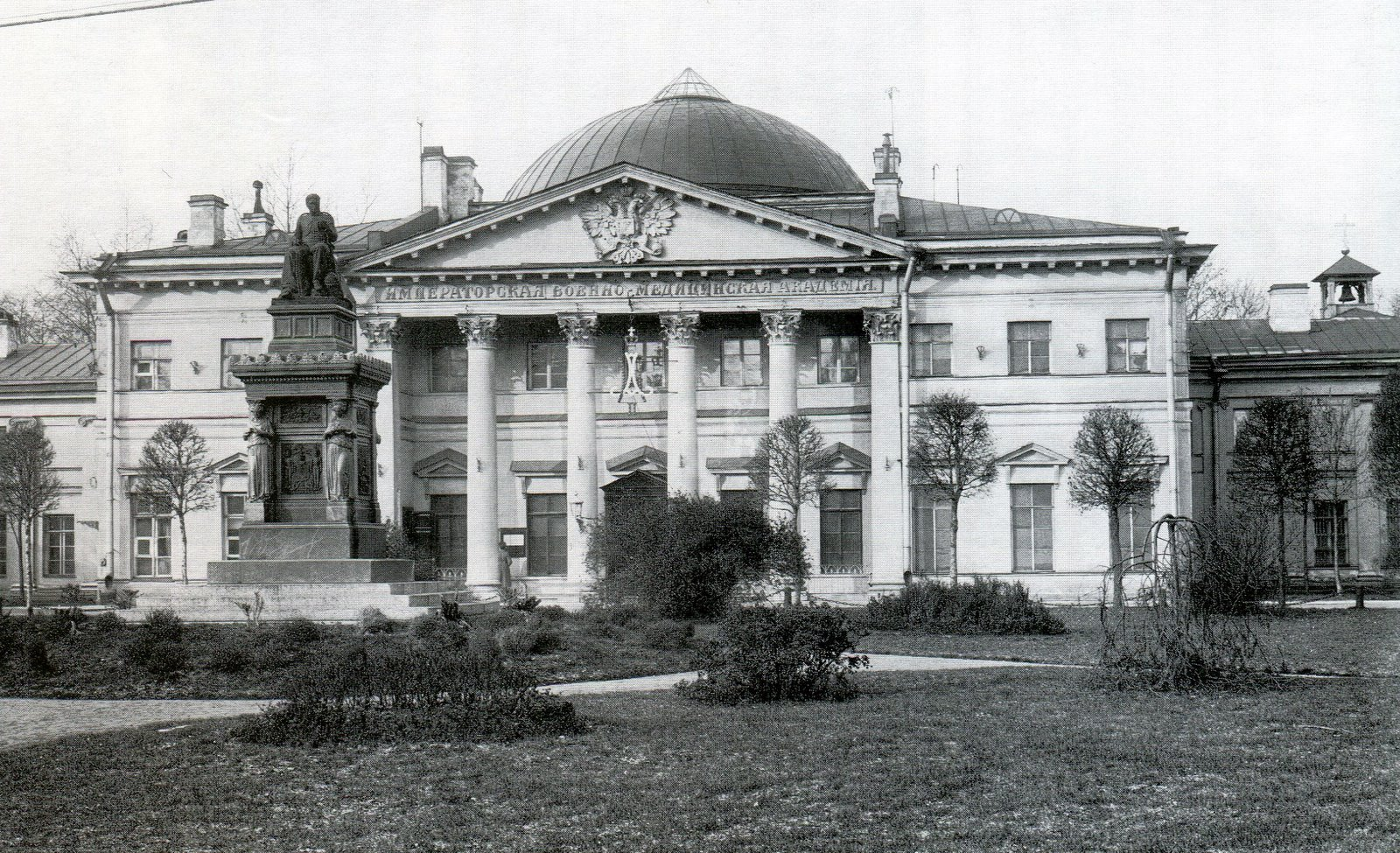
Main building of S.M. Kirov Military Medical Academy facing Academician Lebedev Street

=== St Sampson the Hospitable's Cathedral and churchyard garden ===
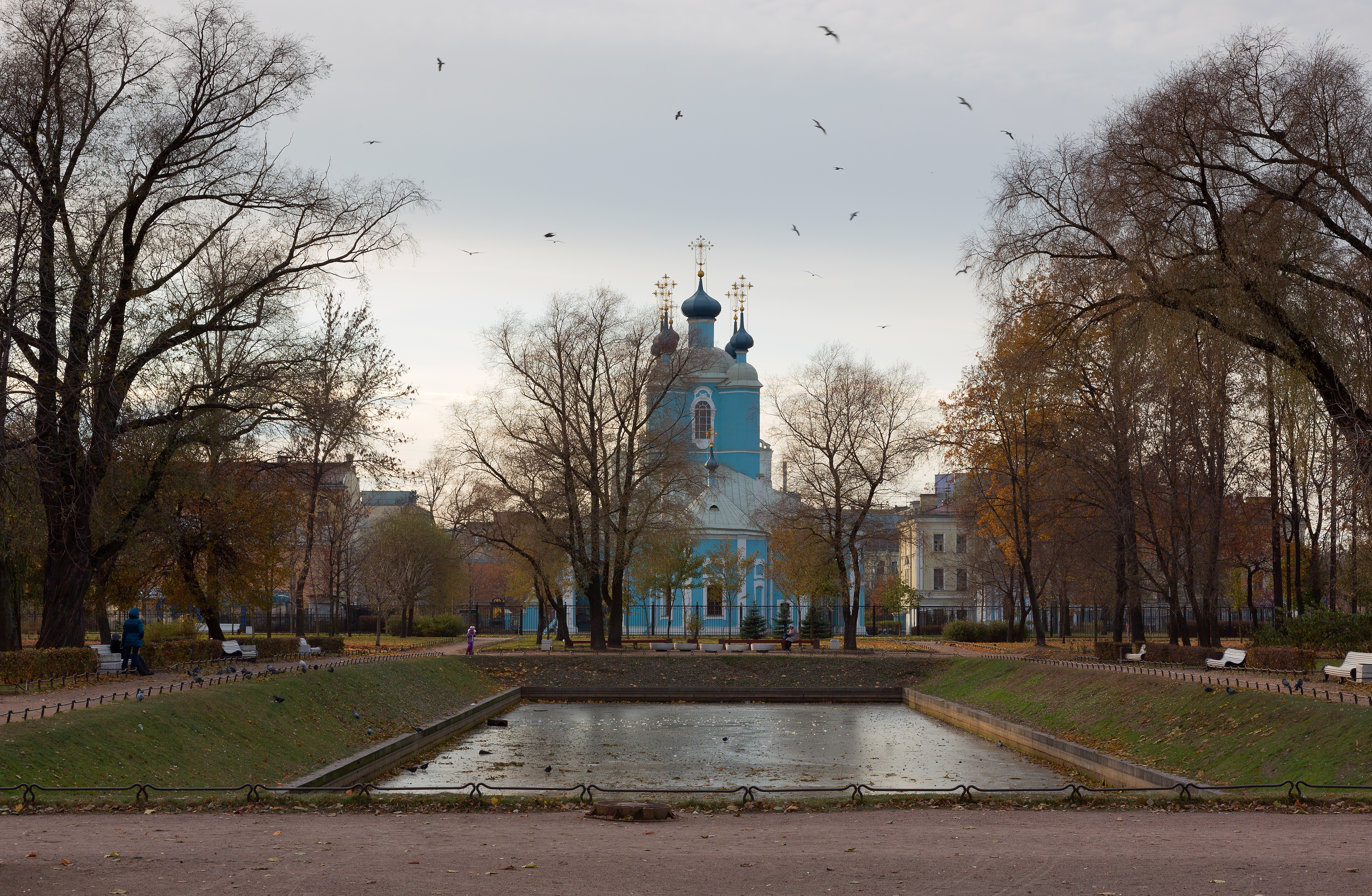
Garden view of the cathedral

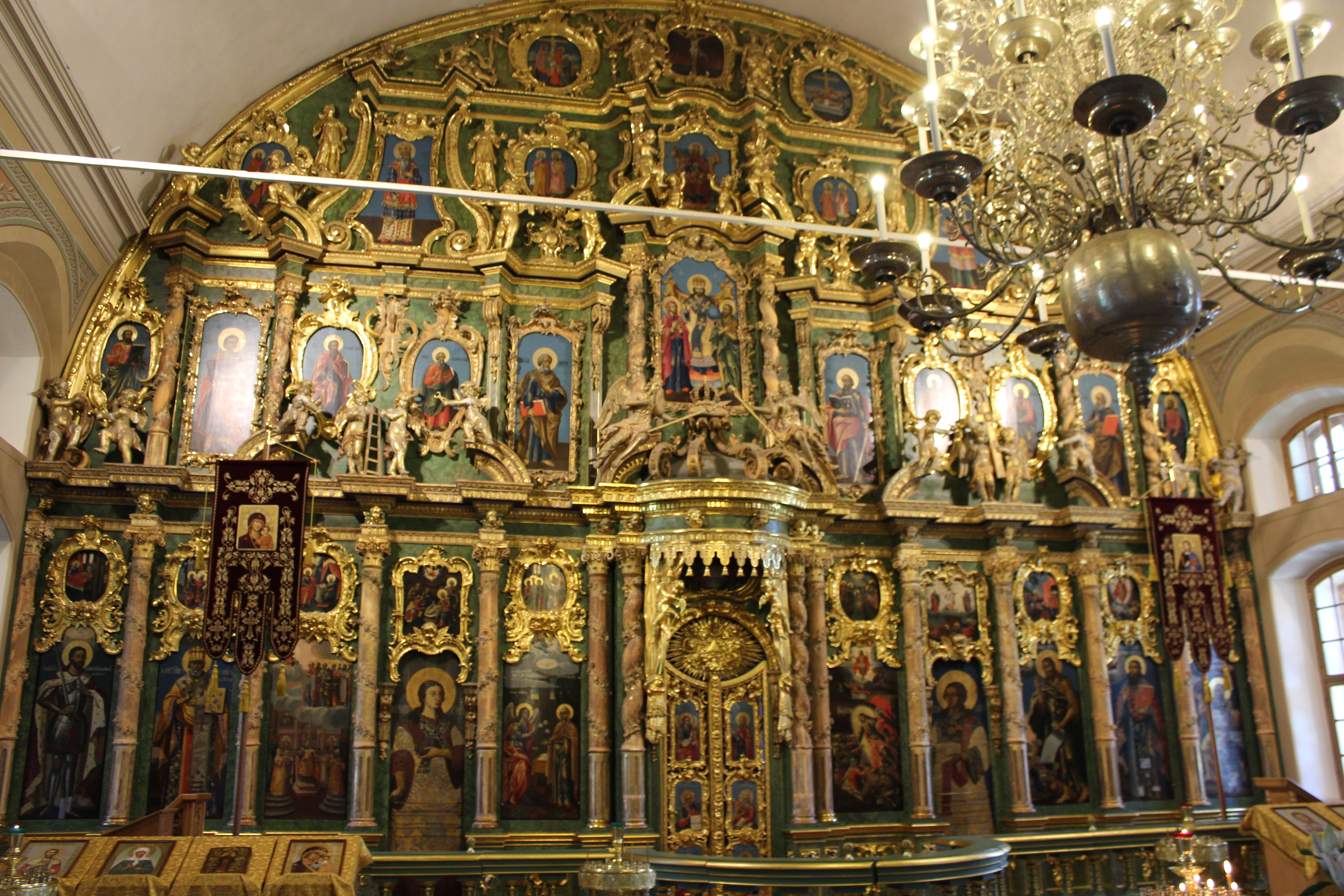
Baroque wooden icon screen

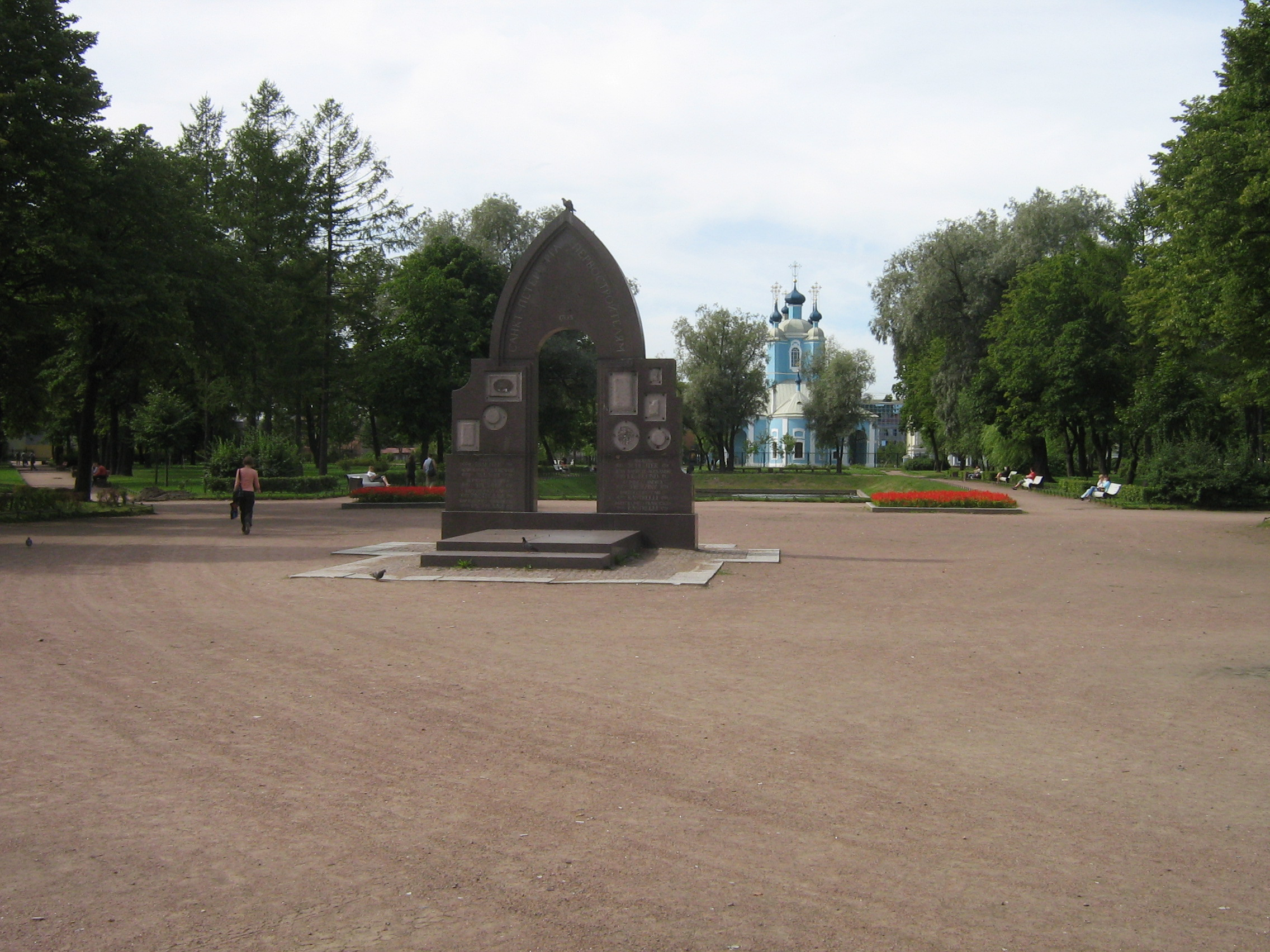
Former 18th-century St Sampson's Cathedral churchyard (now a public garden) facing Lesnoy Prospekt avenue with the vandalised in 2000 bronze and granite monument set up in 1995 by the Russian emigre artist Mikhail Shemyakin and architect Vyacheslav Bukhayev (Rus. Вячеслав Бухаев) to First-builders of Saint Petersburg (ru:Первостроителям Санкт-Петербурга) - especially the European architects who designed city's 18th-century layout and landmarks and were buried in this ground. Bronze details such as the full-scale models of drawing desk with memento mori (skull), candlestick, 17th-century Dutch chair and wall tablets already stolen. The granite wall with its Gothic arch typical of European architecture, but not Russian, was designed as a wall of an architect's studio with "a window on Europe". Original look on Yandex Images.

=== Ludwig Nobel factory residential complex ===
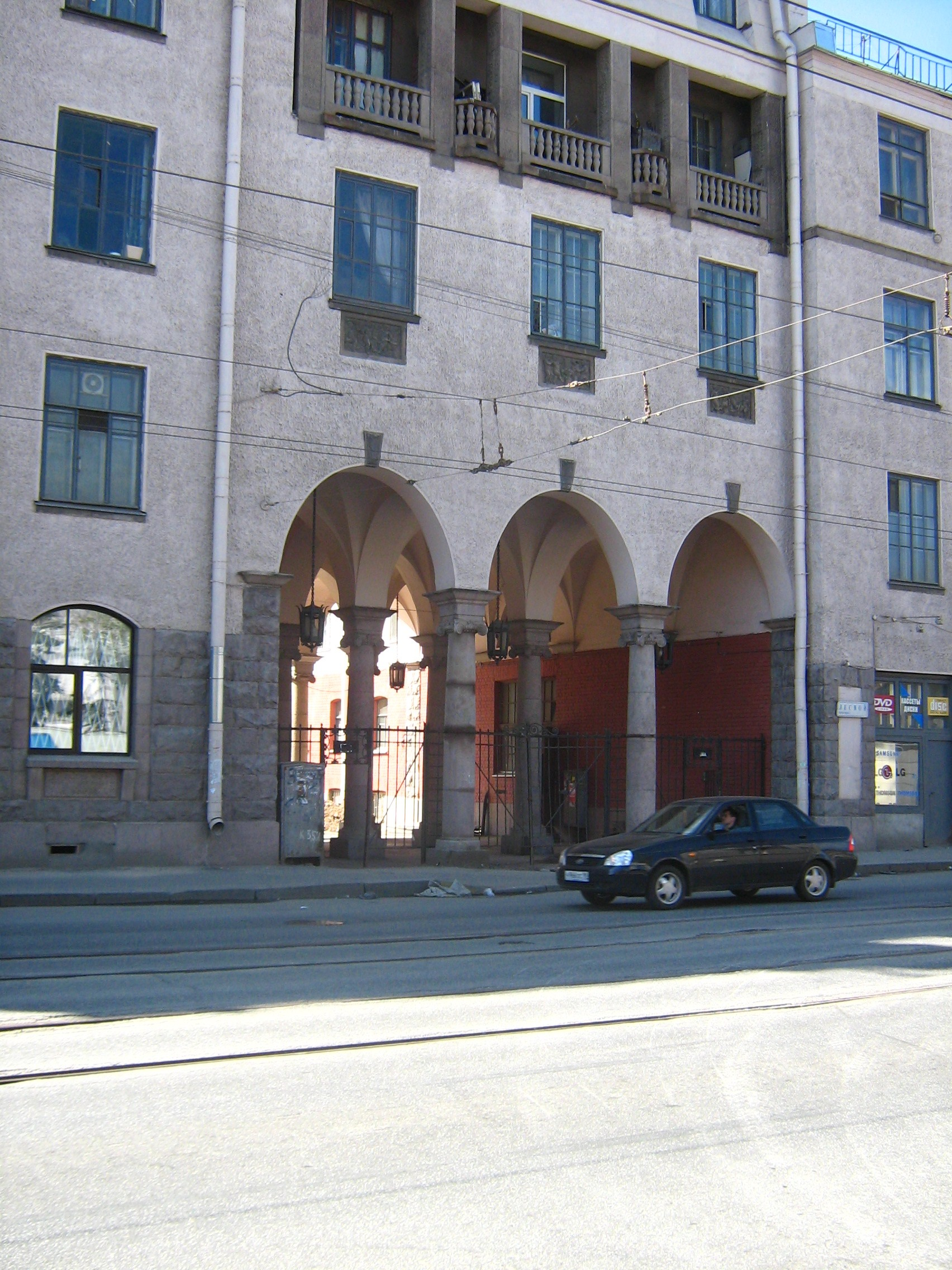

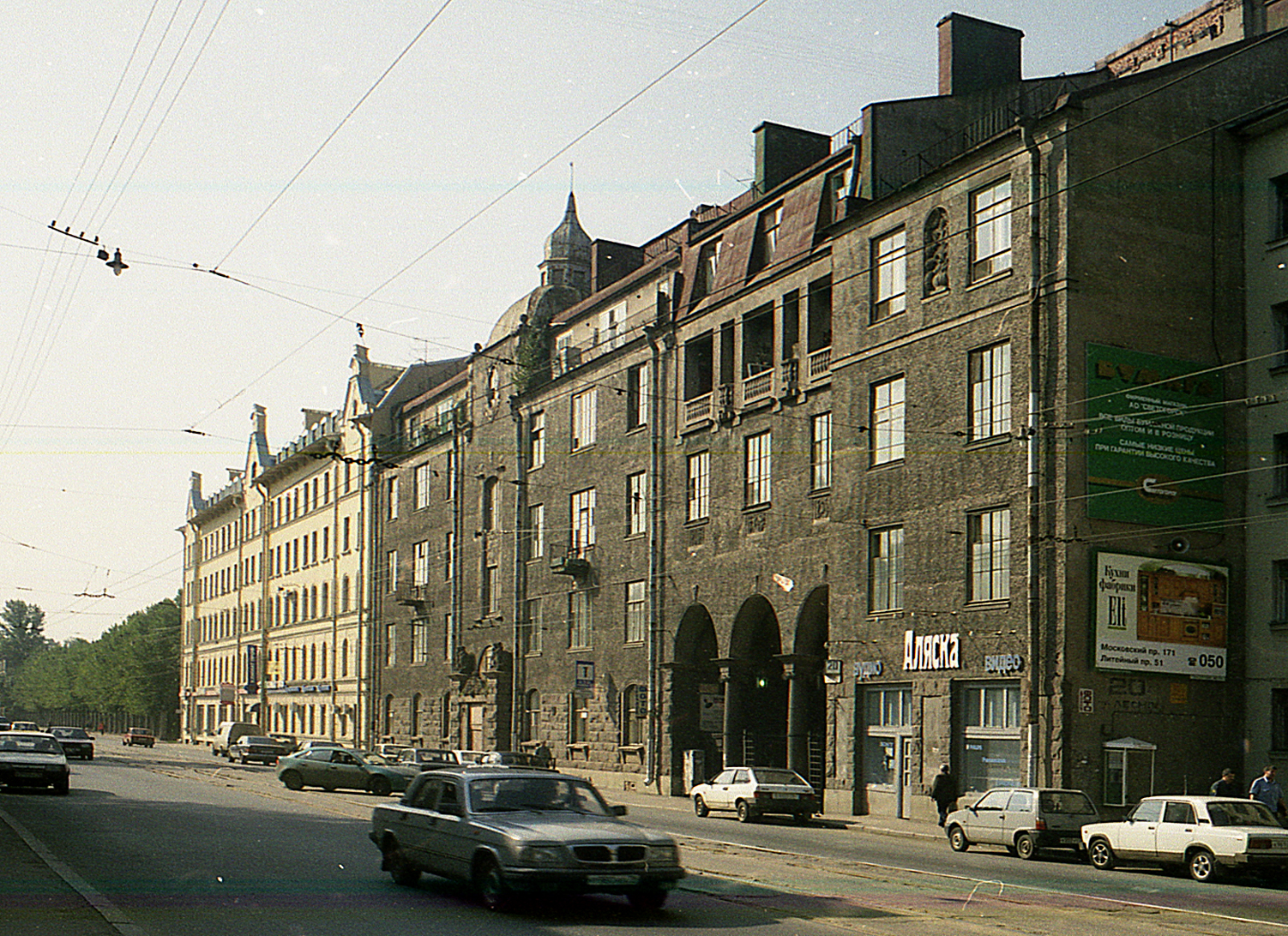

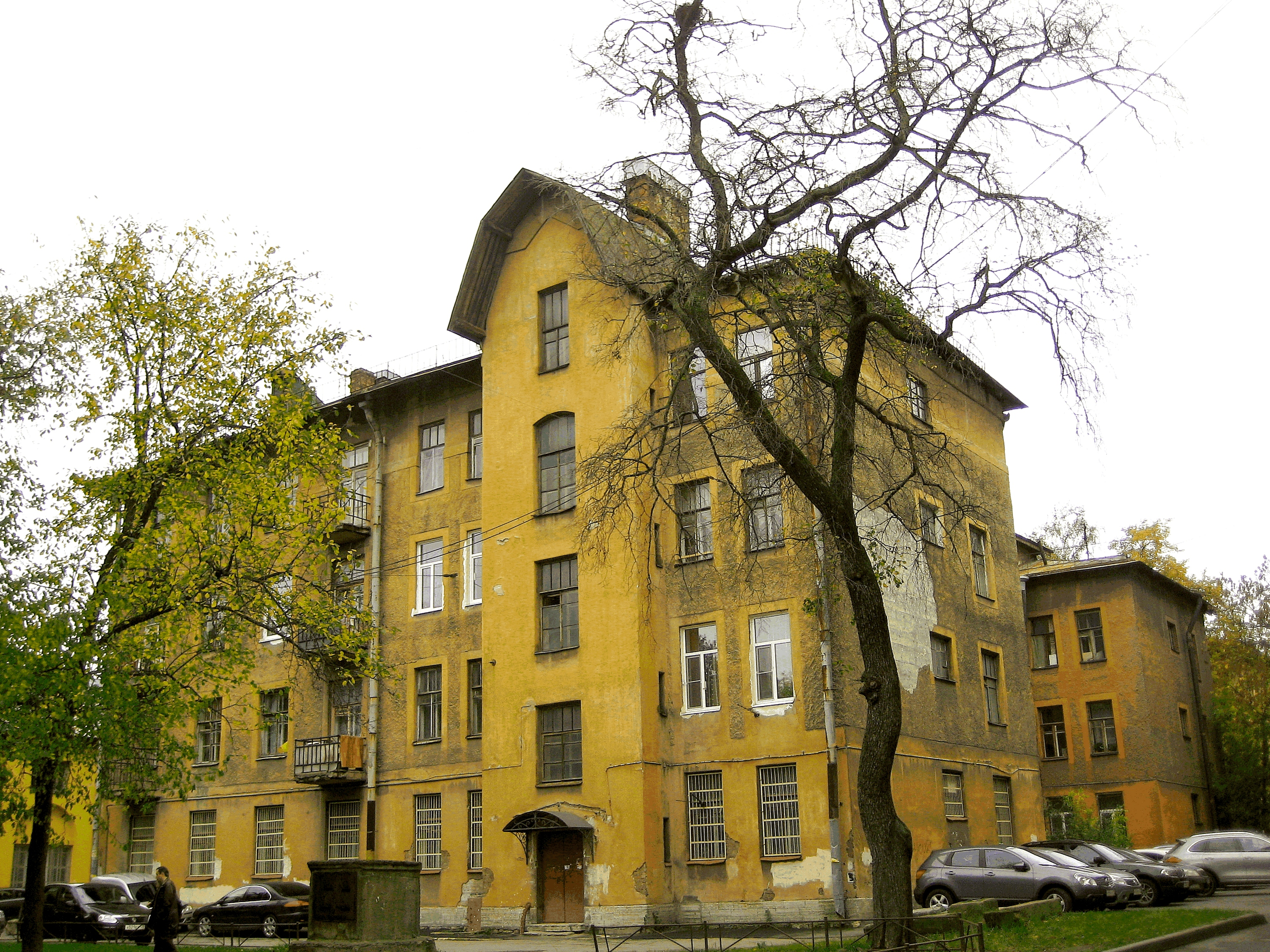

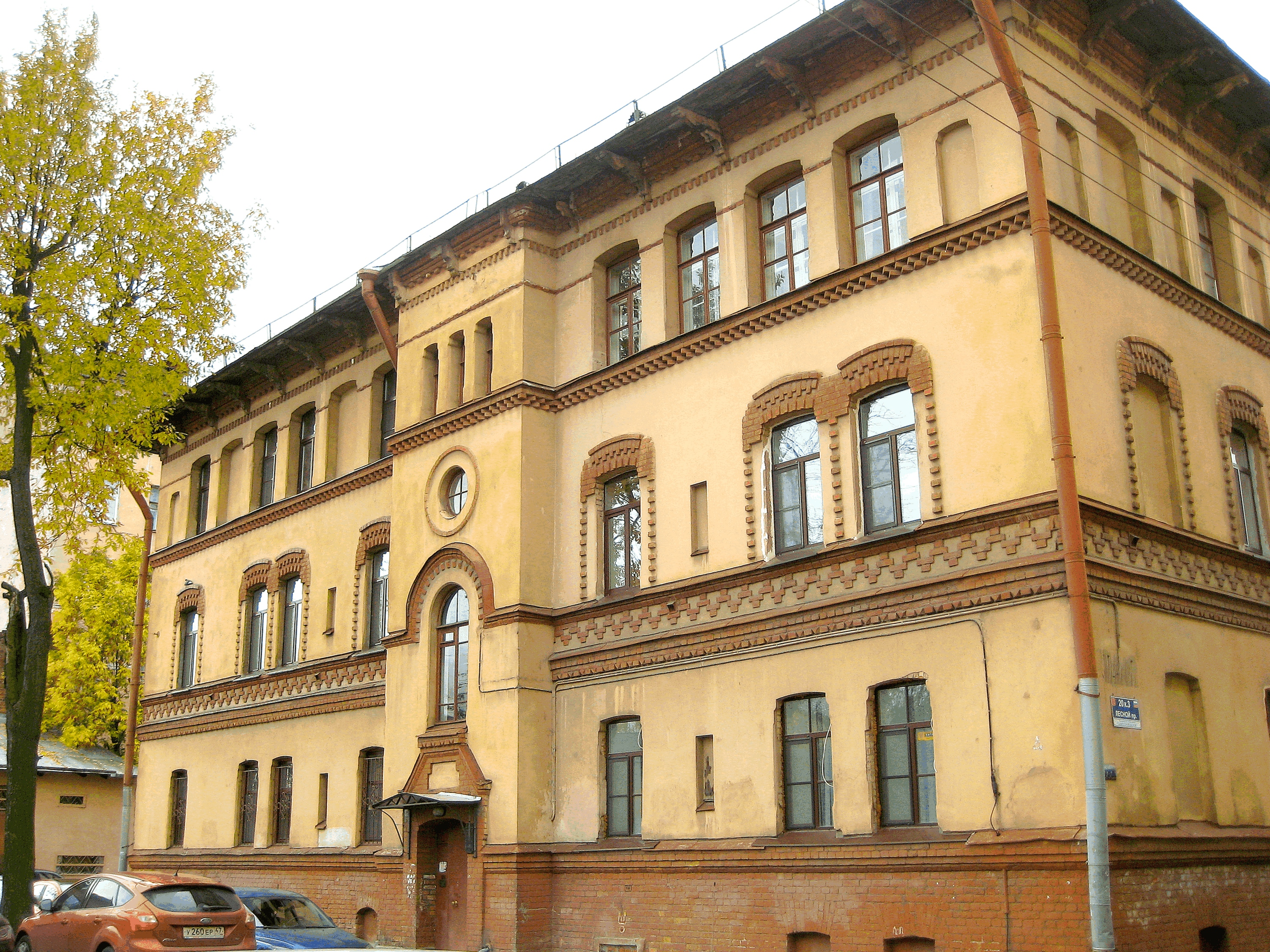

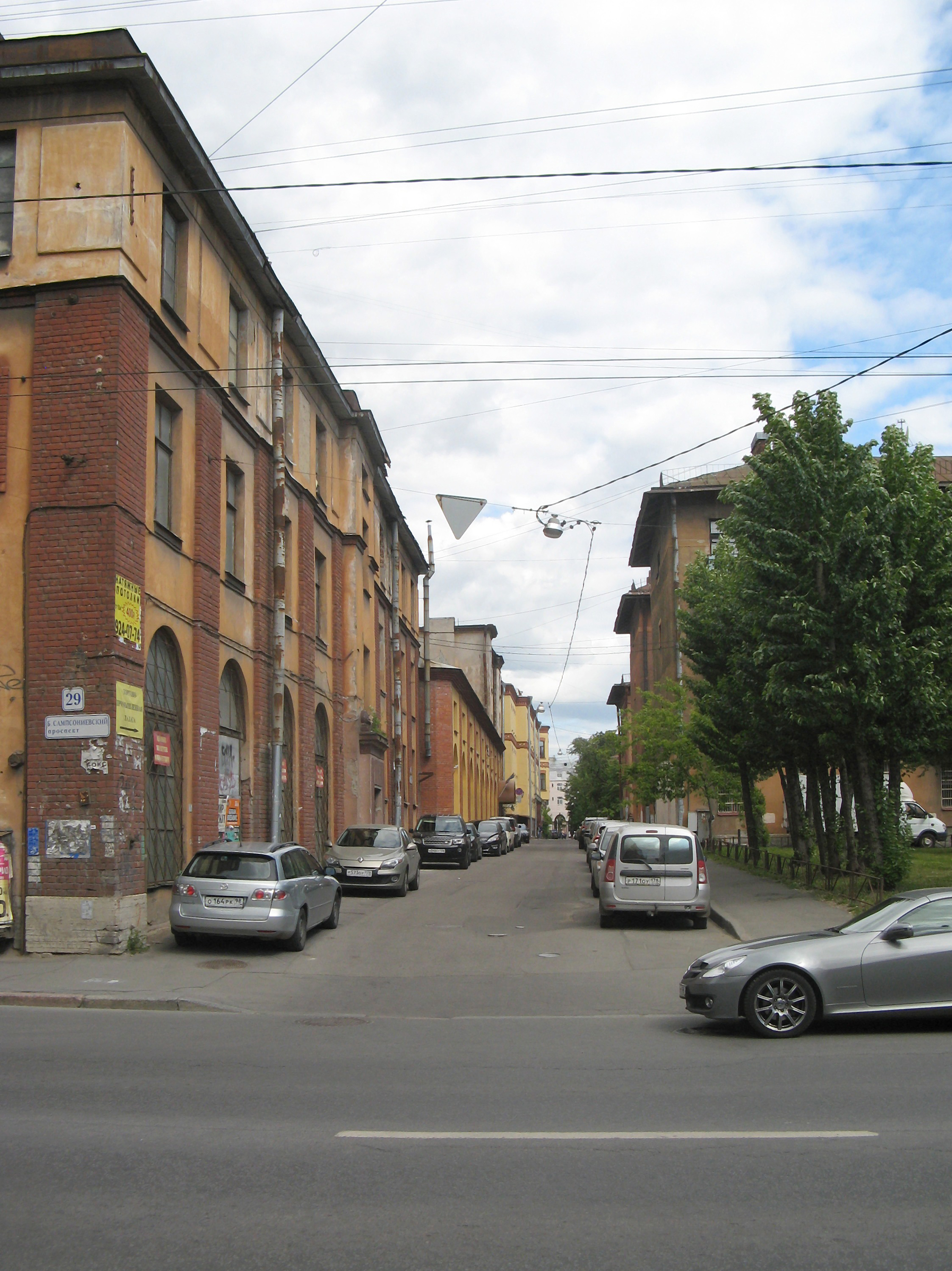
Nobel Lane

=== Vyborgskaya Embankment and industrial architecture ===
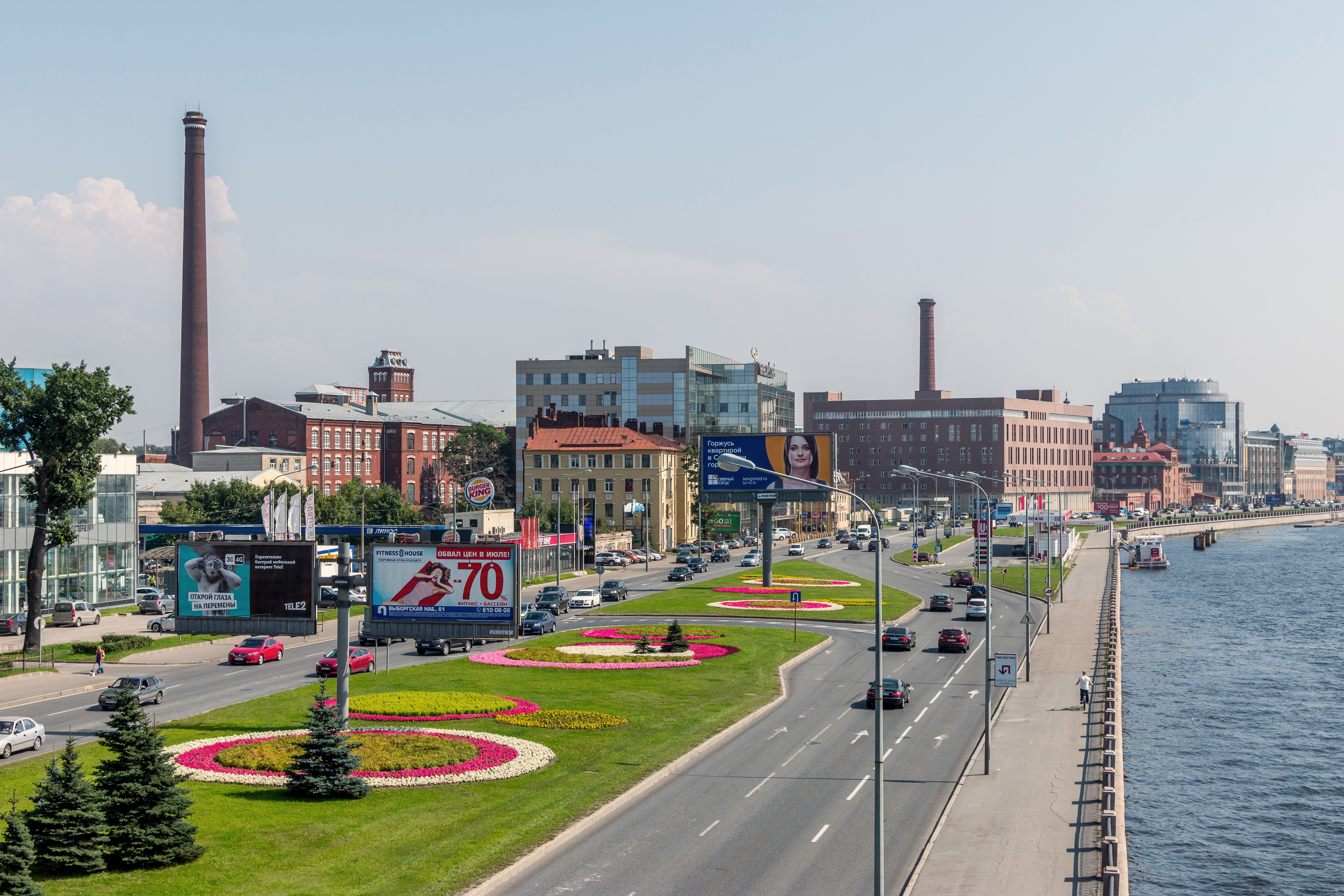

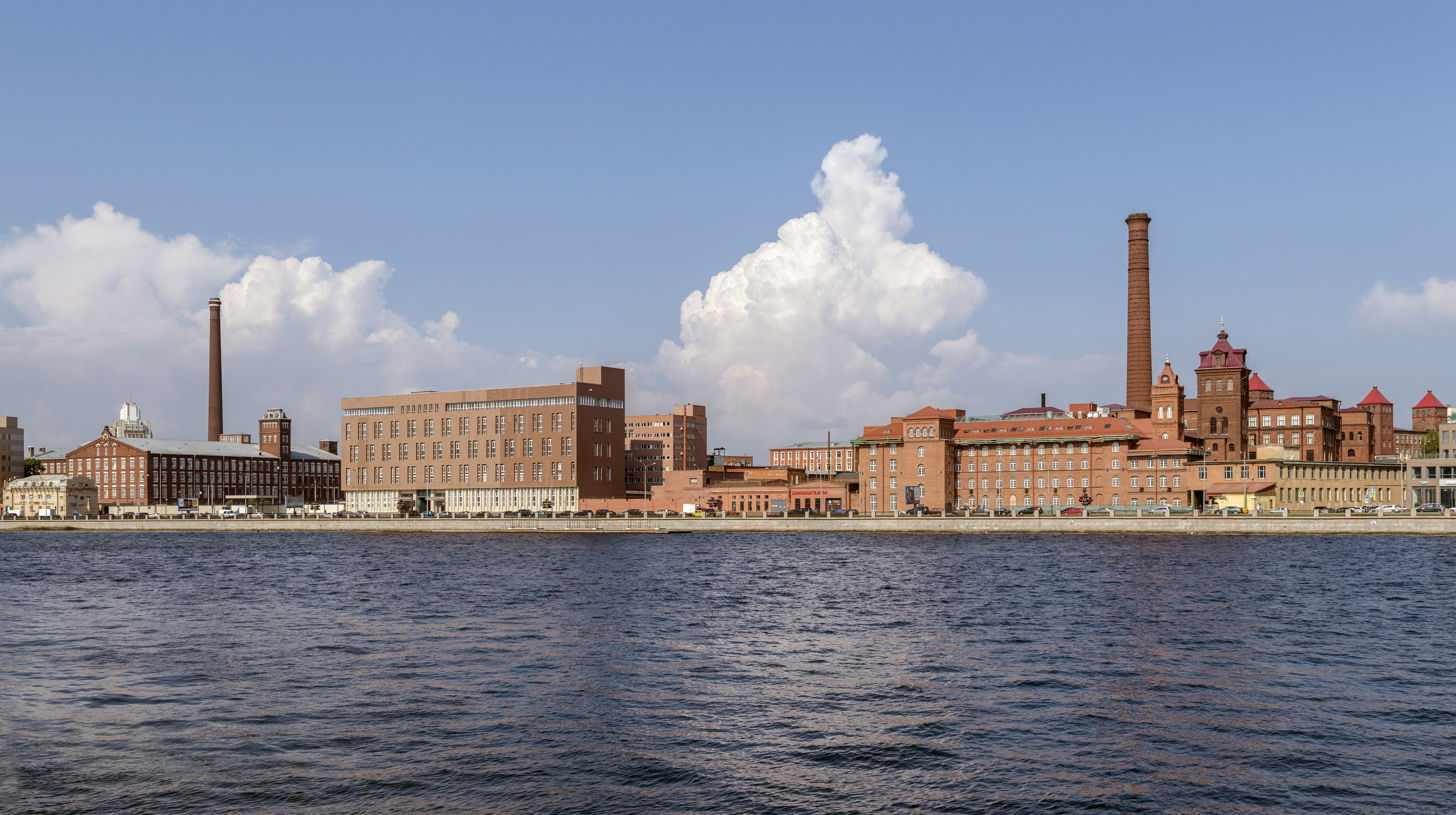

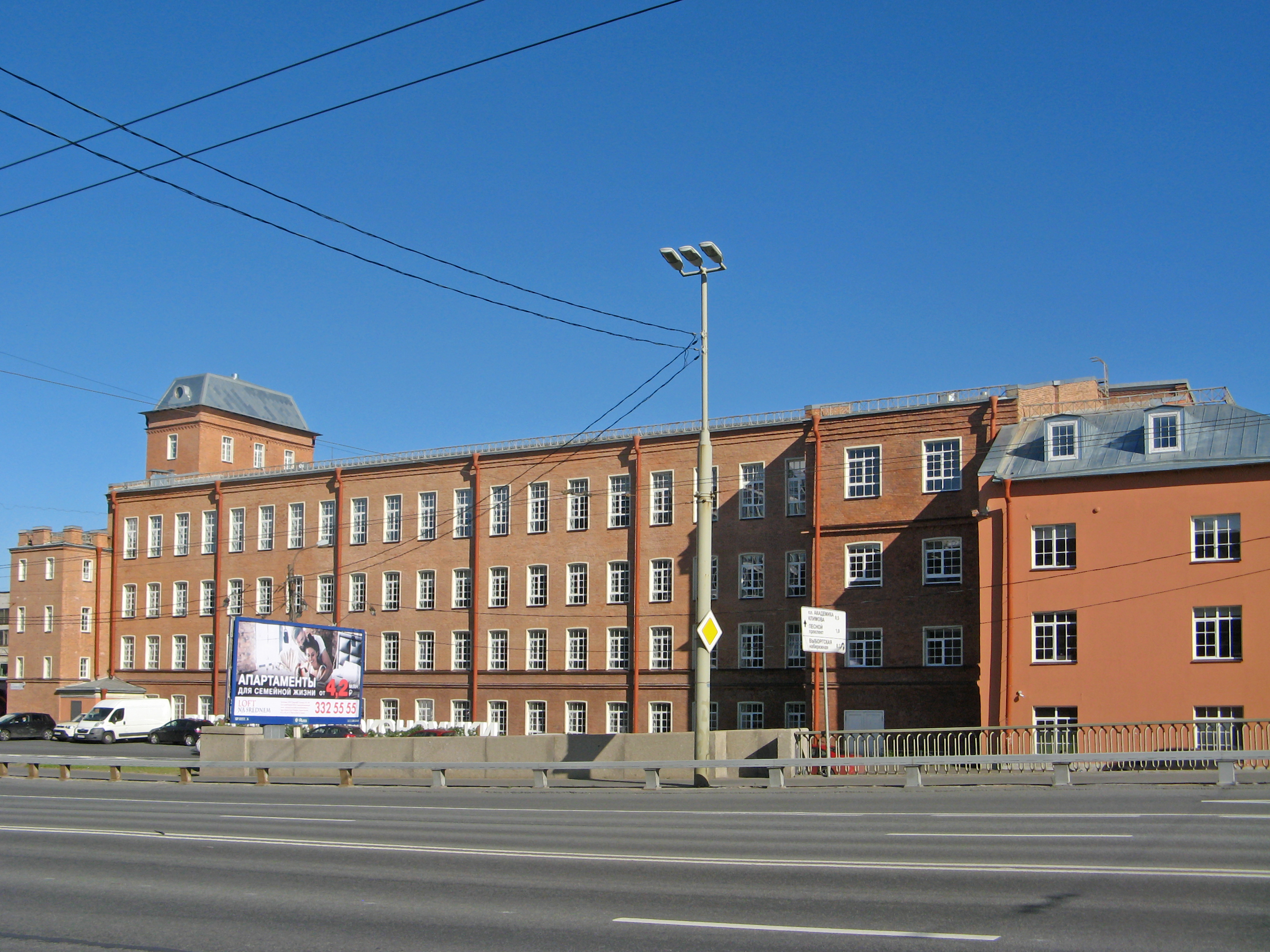

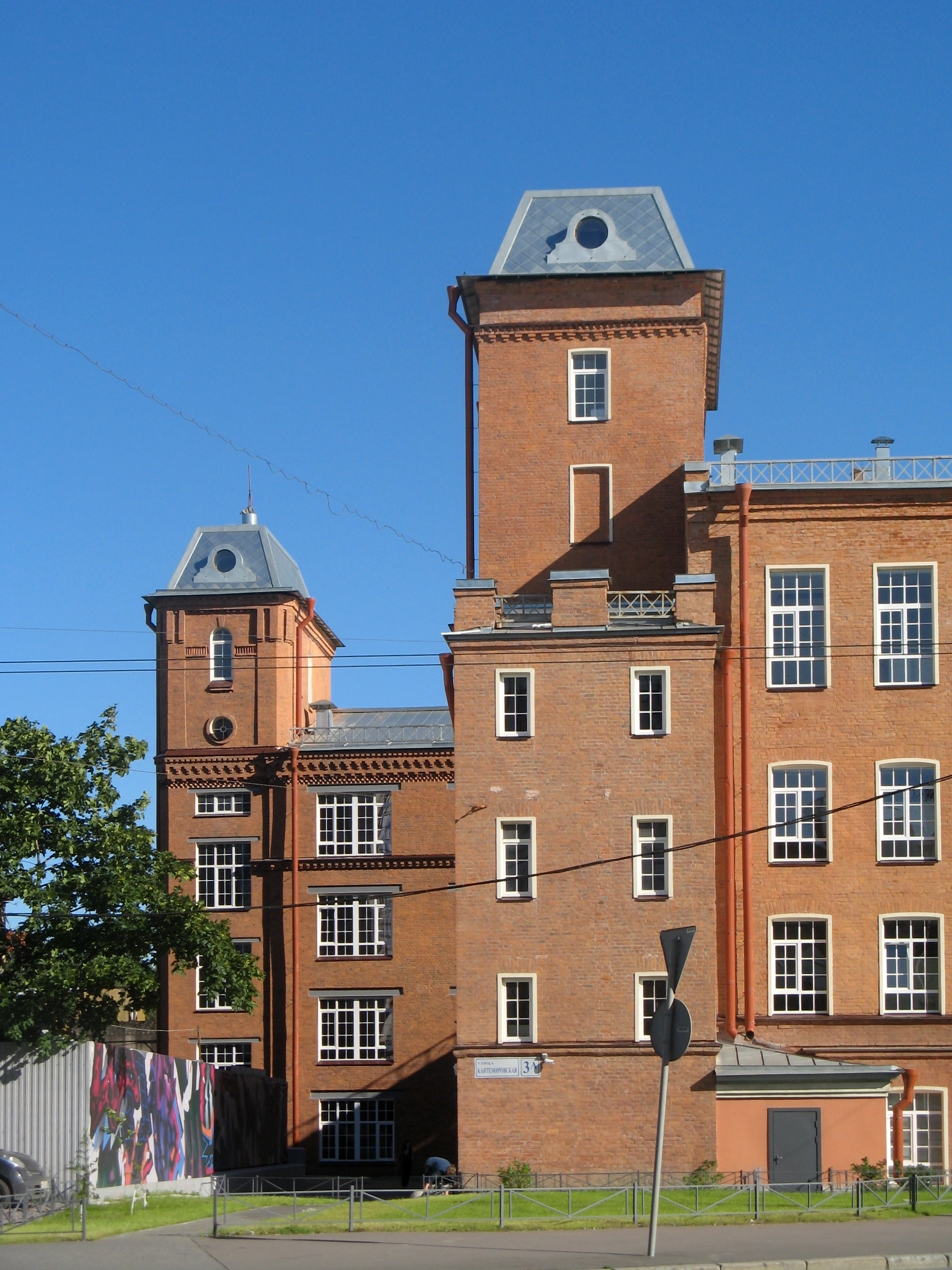

=== Pediatric University ===
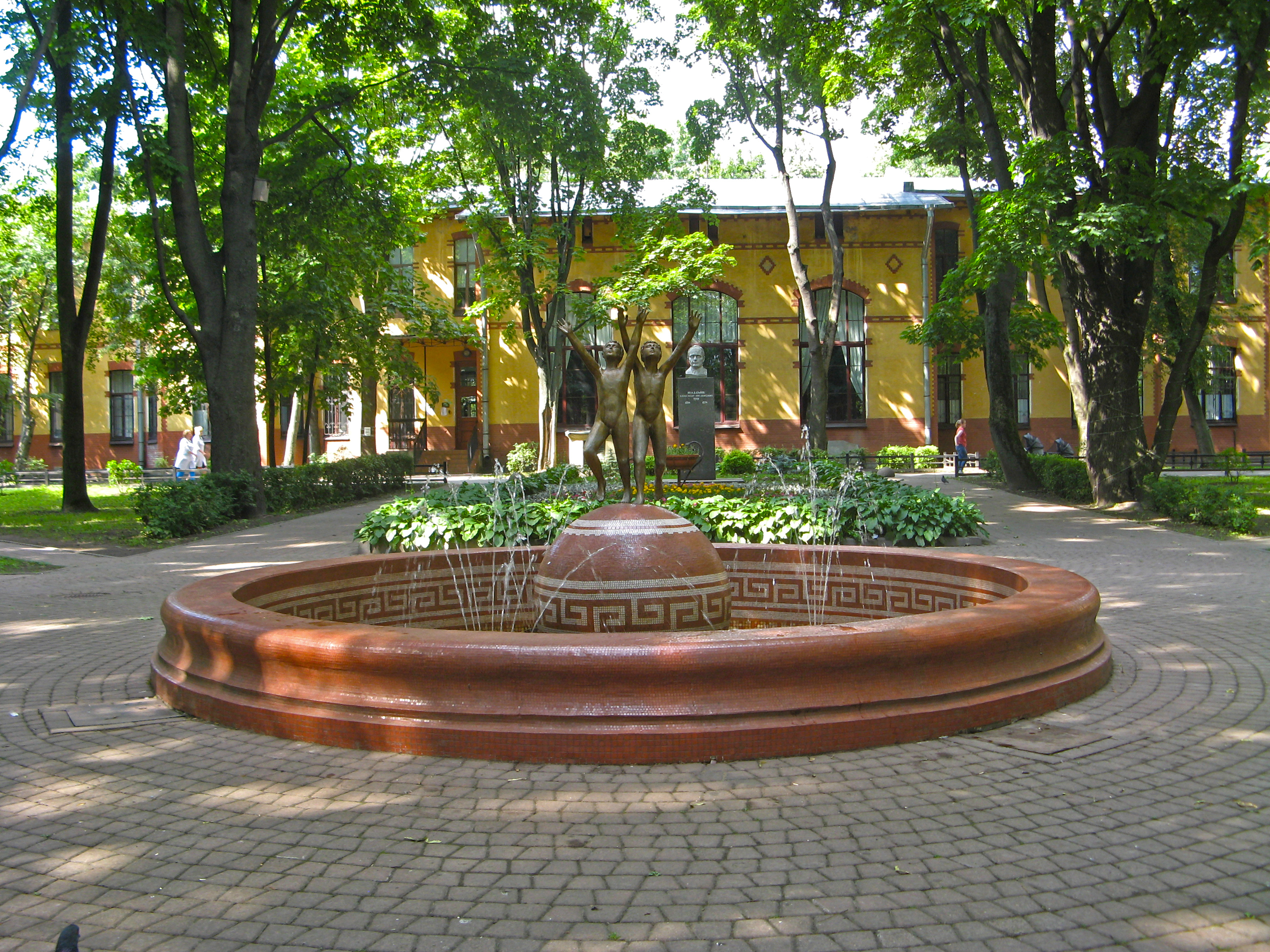
Pediatric University campus's modern fountain in front of a 19th-century clinic building

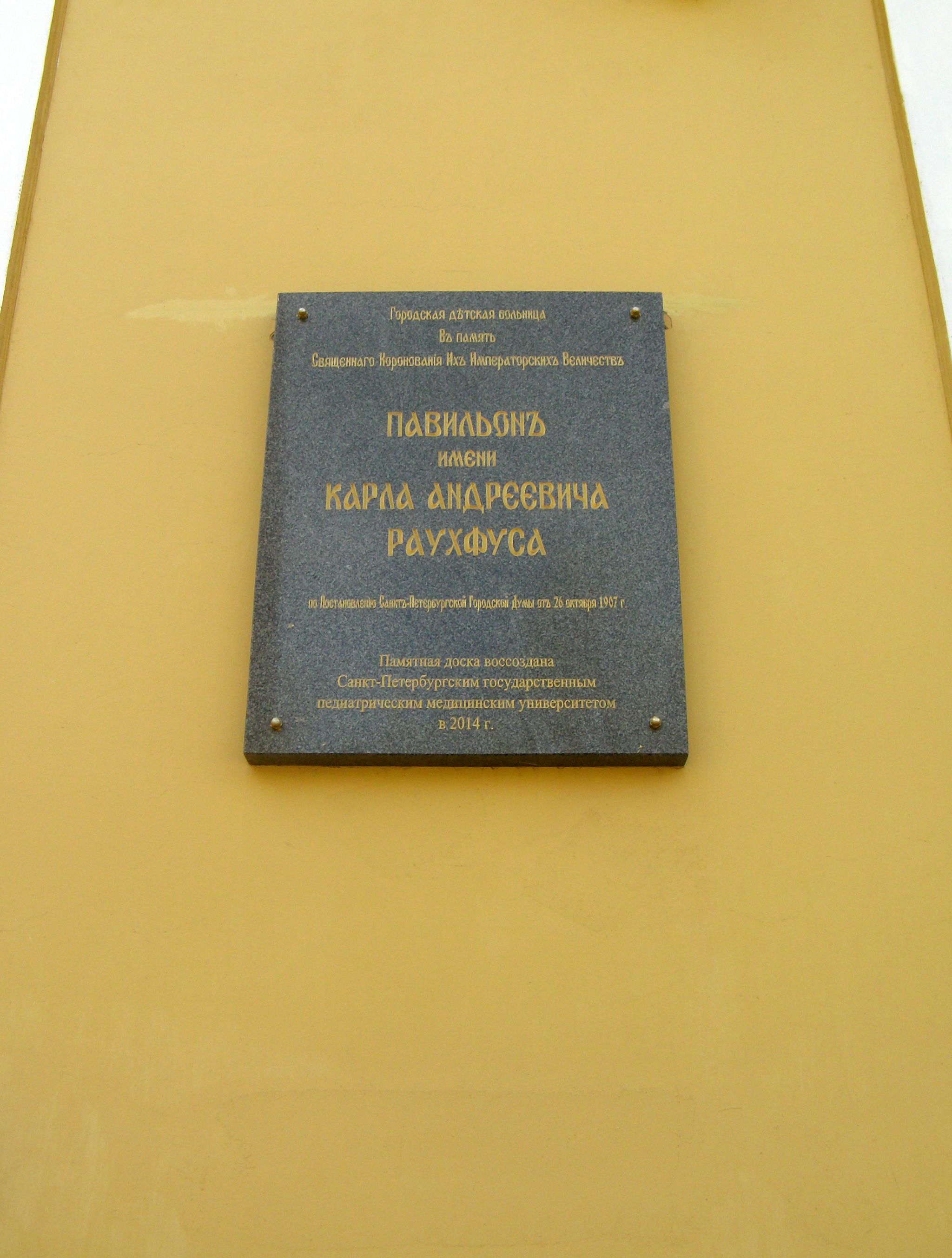
Karl Rauchfuss Building restored memorial plaque

Monument and memorial plaque to Professor Alexander Tur

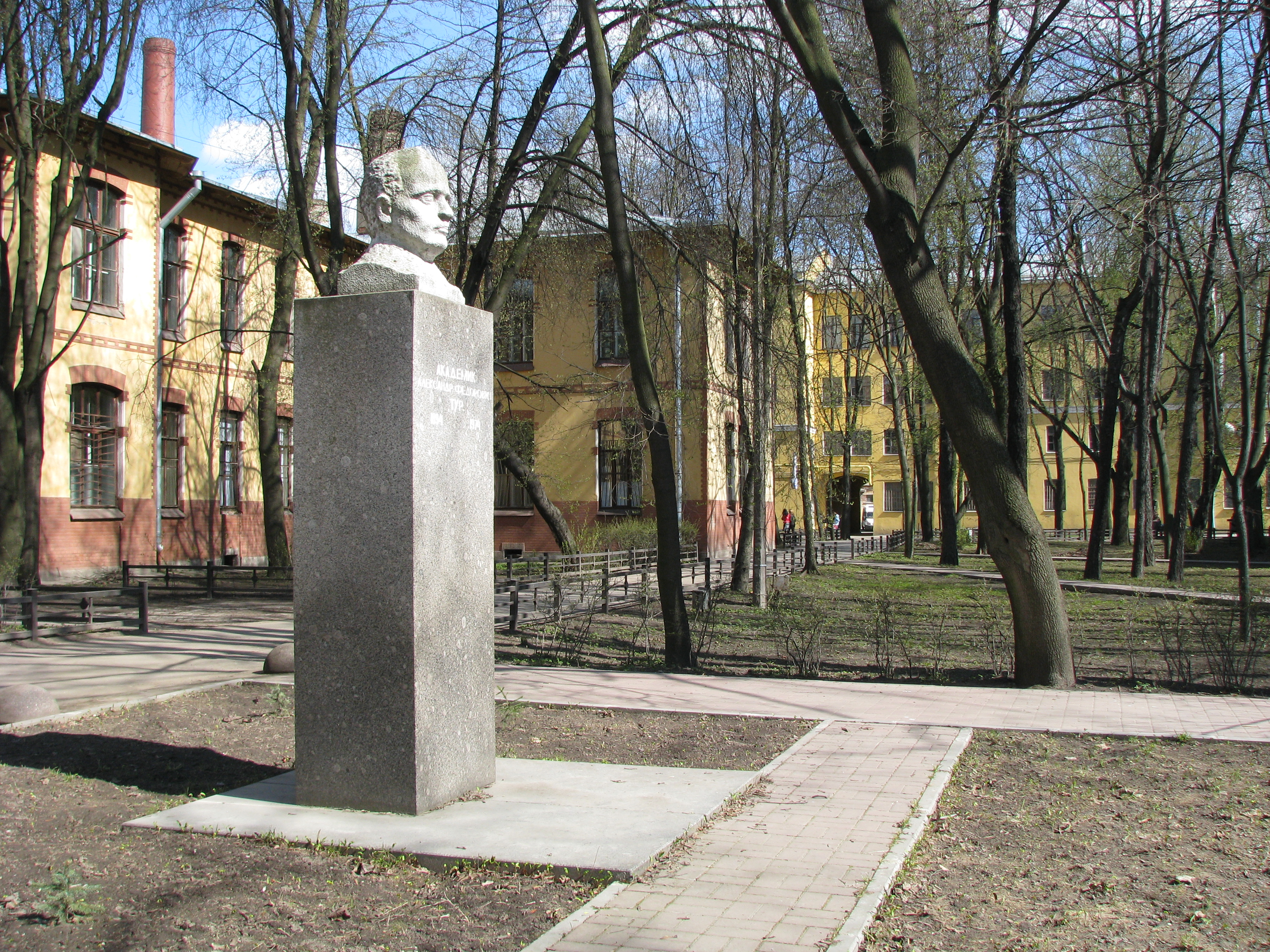

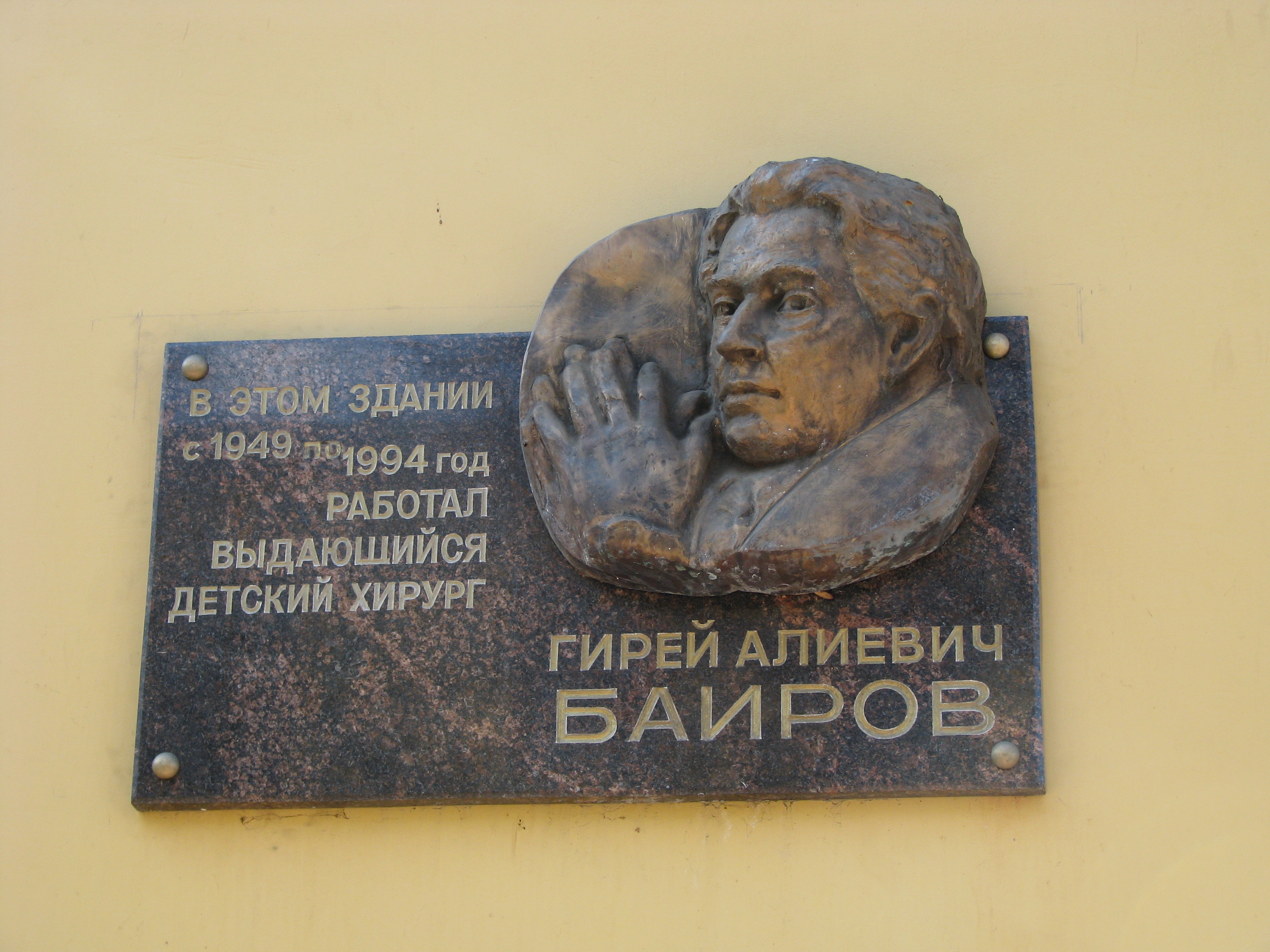
Girey Bairov, famous pediatric surgeon, memorial plaque

=== Soviet times ===
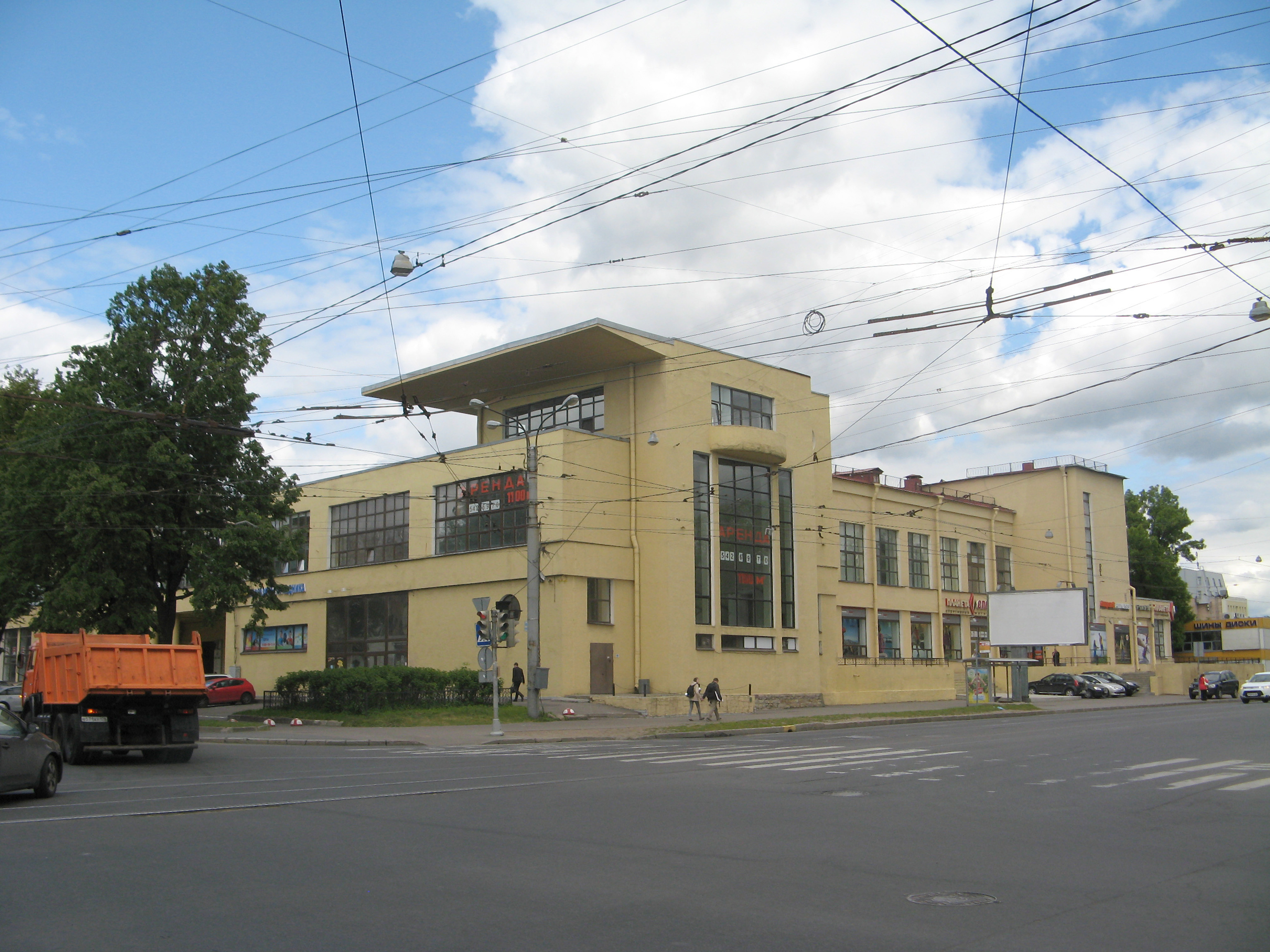
Building of the 1929 Constructivism architectural style former public kitchen of Vyborgskiy District

==== Secondary school number 104 ====
School bears the name of a Soviet World War II hero officer Mikhail Kharchenko and stands along the street of his name, with entrance facing the corner of Kantemirovskaya Street.

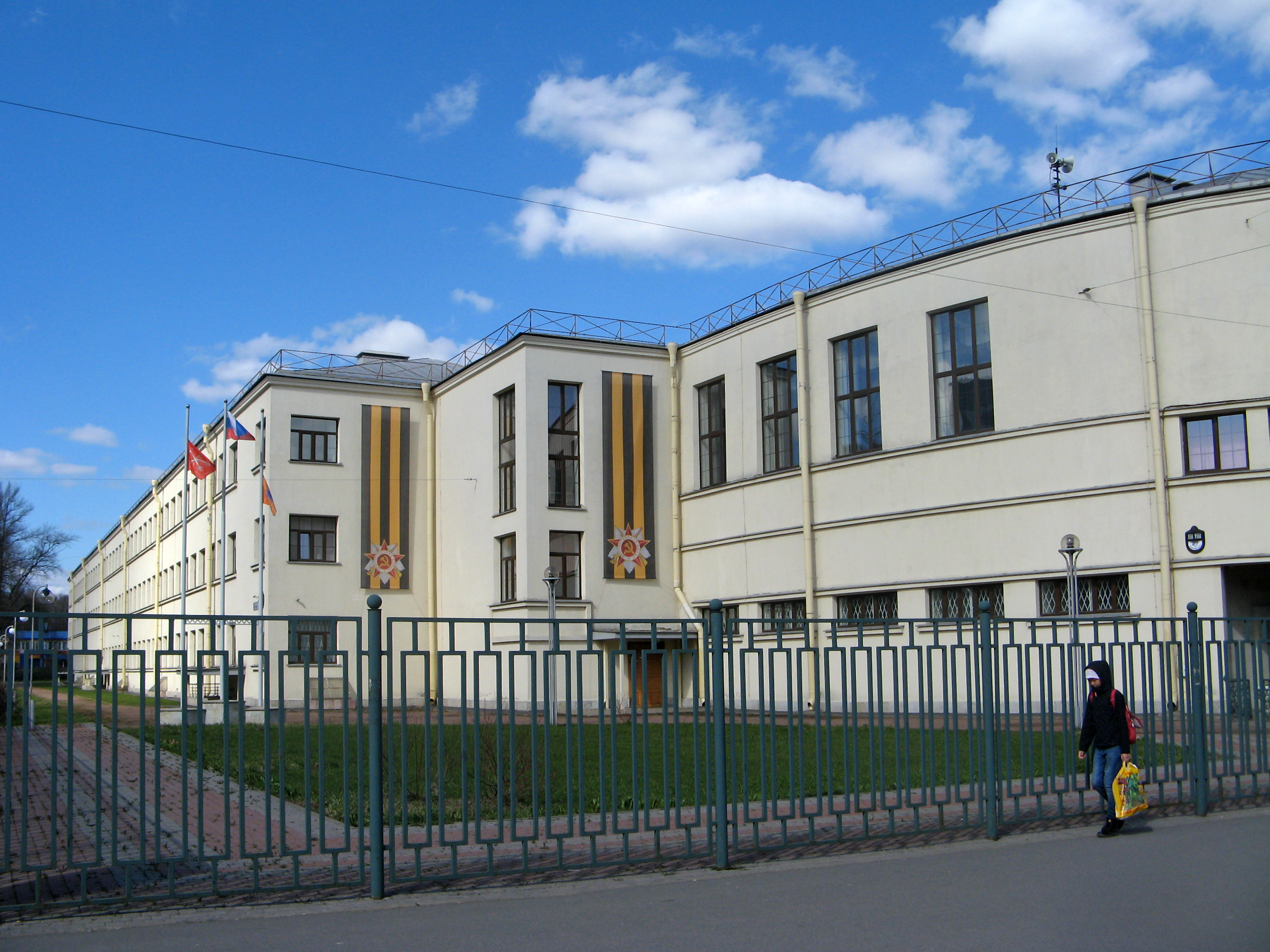

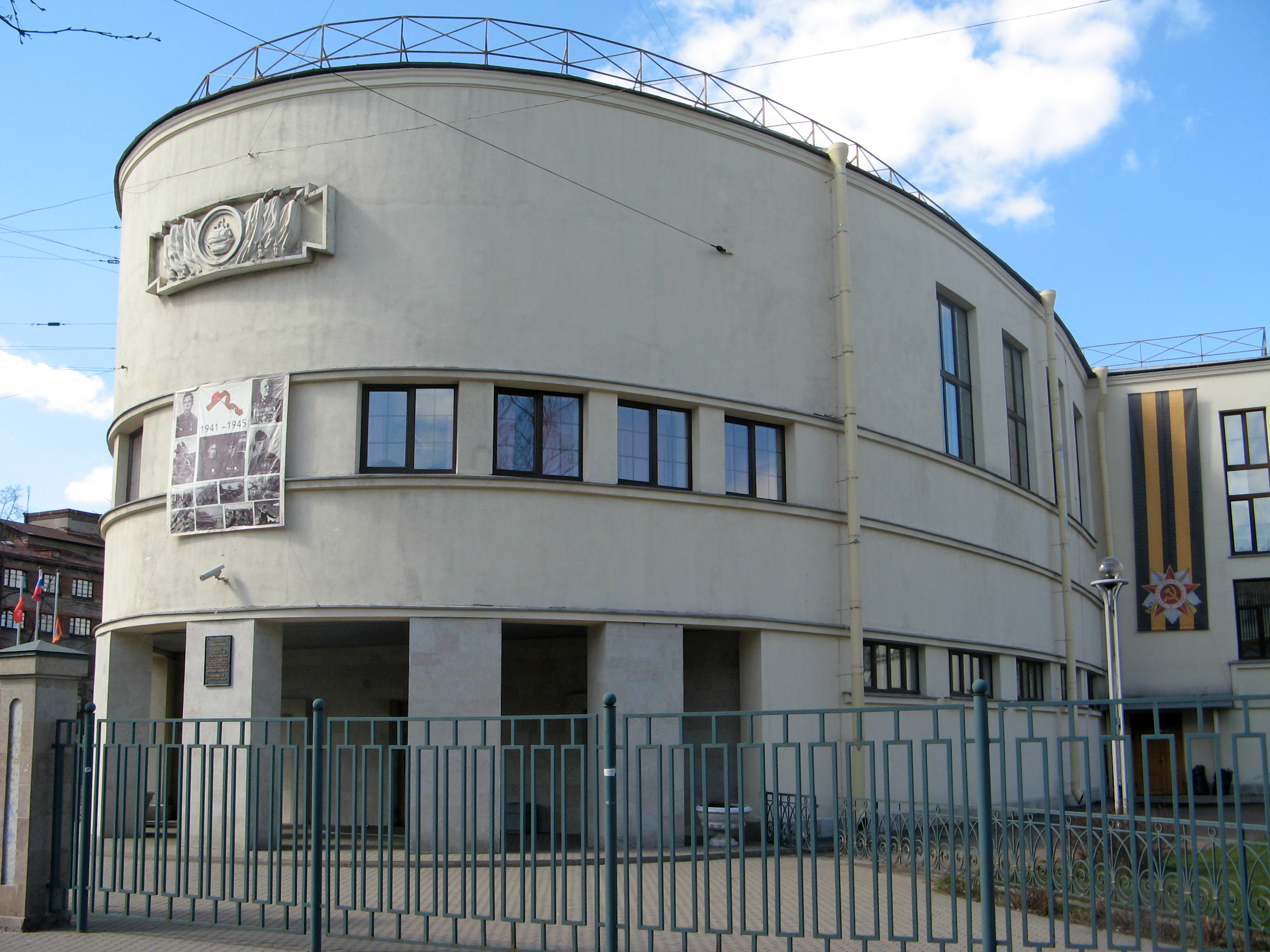

==== House of Specialists ====
House of Specialists (Saint Petersburg)

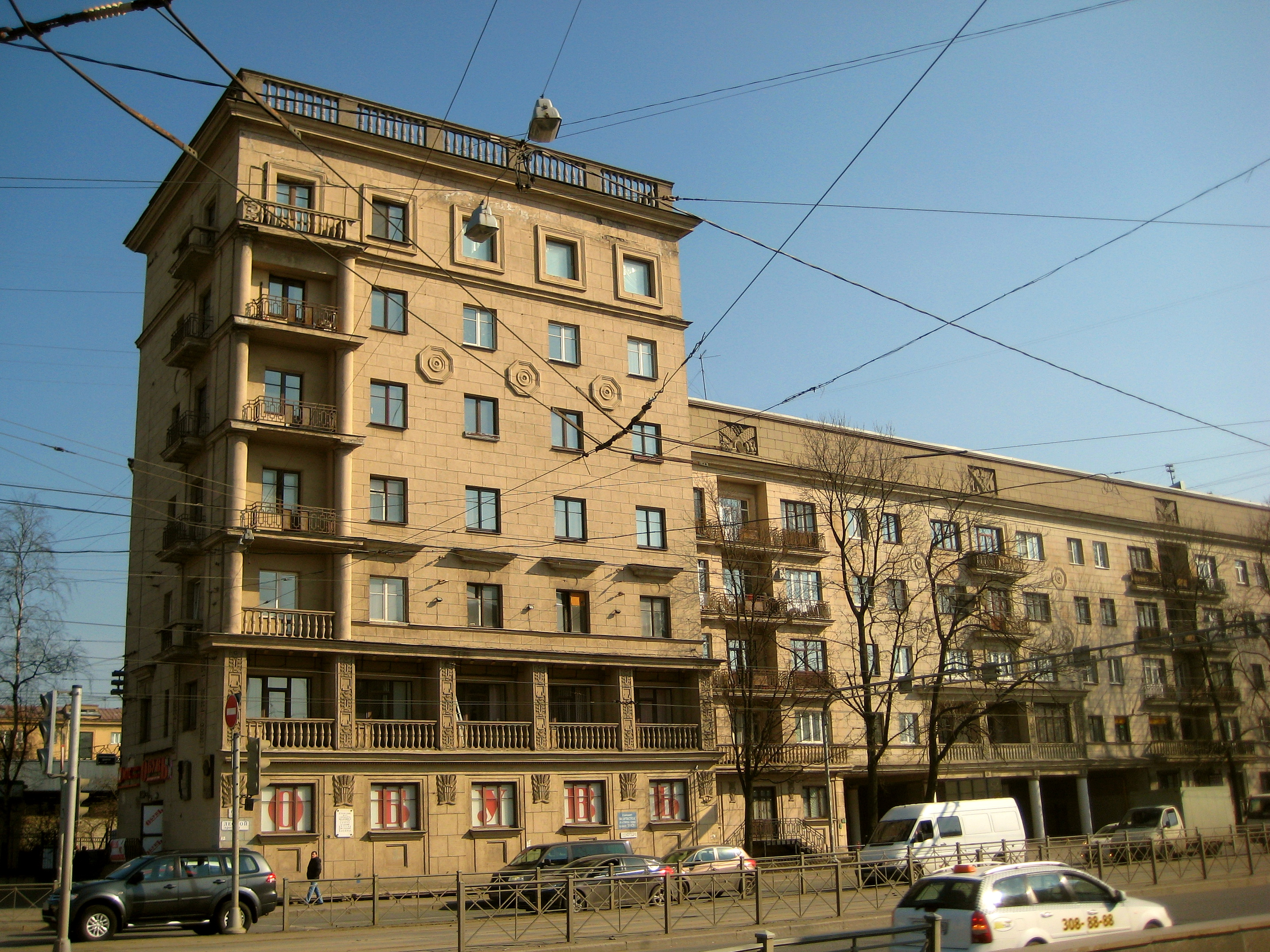
Building 1 of 3 of residential complex The house of Specialists at 61, Lesnoy prospekt, with 1930s' best facilities for scientists, factory management and art workers

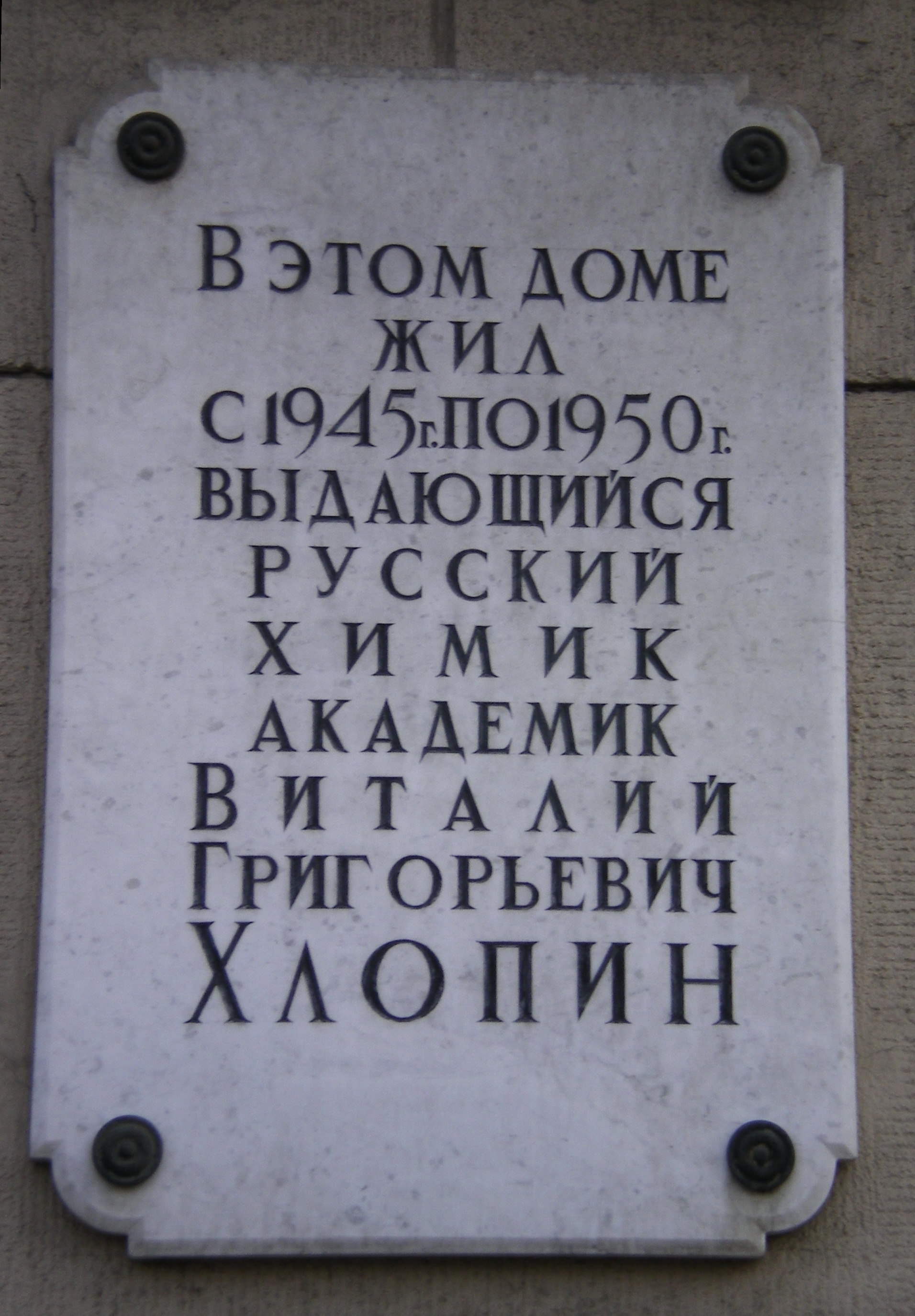
Commemorative plaque for radiochemist Professor Vitaliy Khlopin, founder of Radium Institute

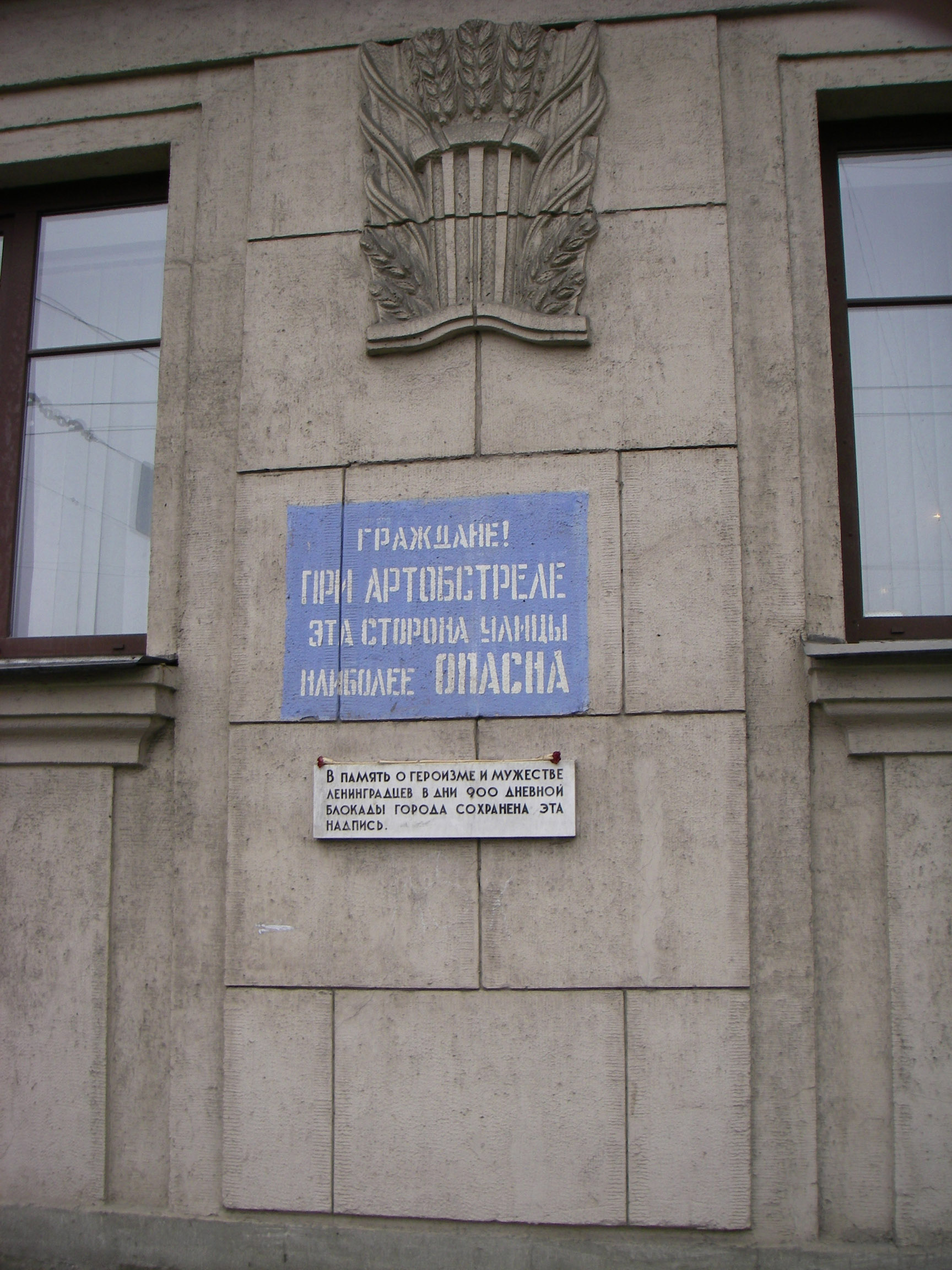
Recreated World War II warning that this side of the street is the more dangerous one during enemy's artillery fire

==== Former building of Pulp and Paper Industry College and later of Design Bureau for Special Machine-Building ====
The building with its front garden. Designed for the college, occupied almost until 2020s by machine-builders.

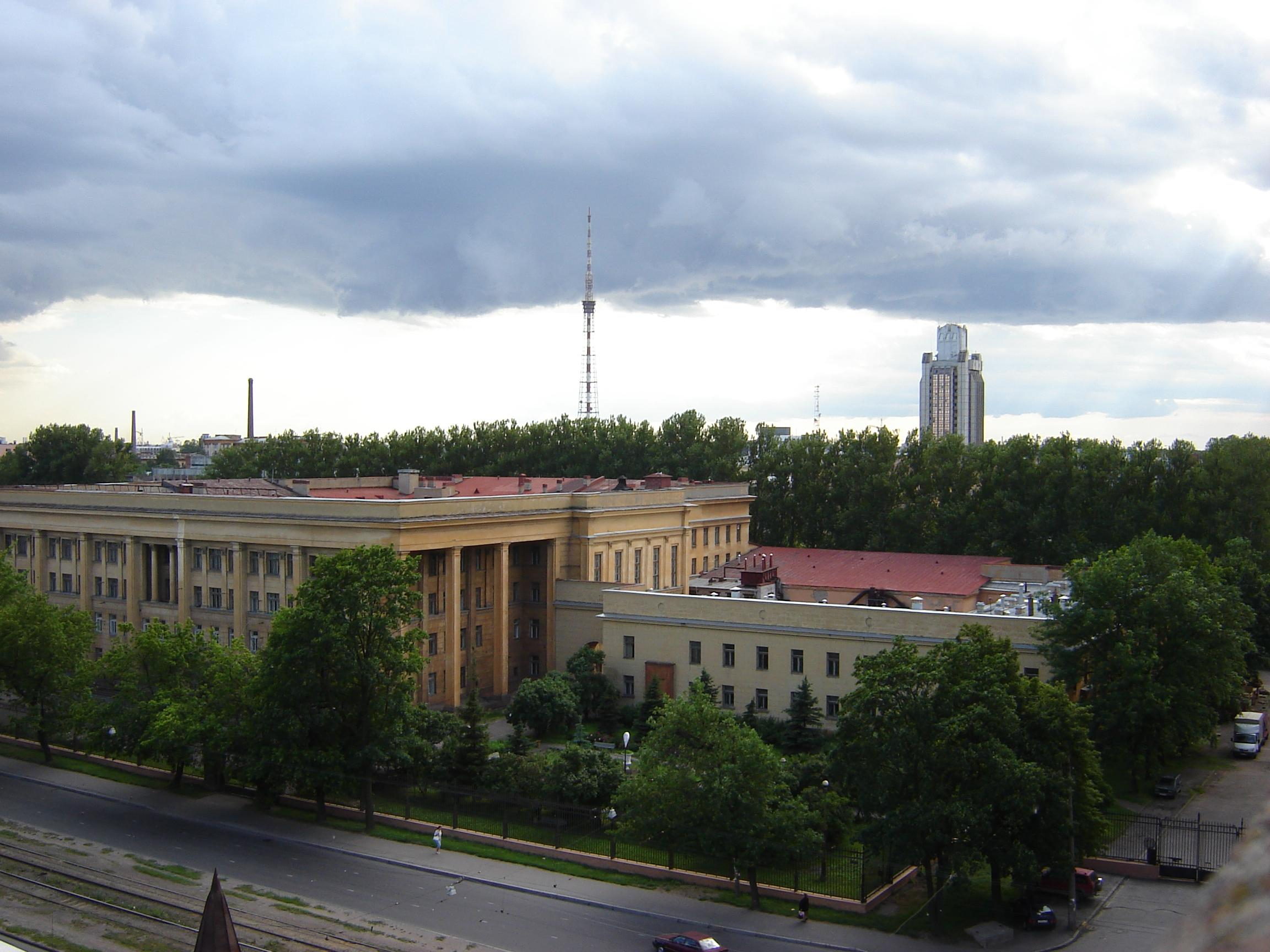

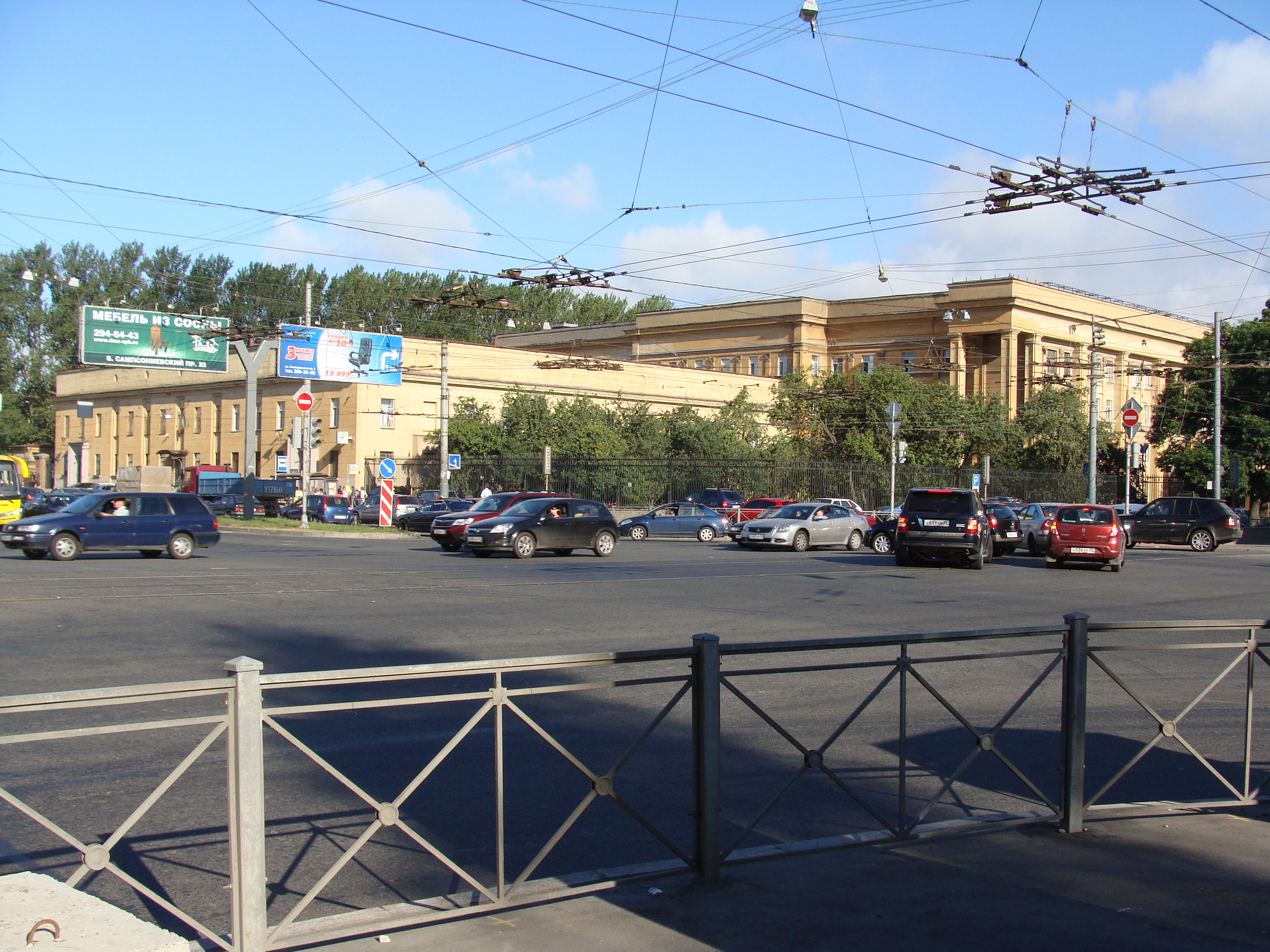

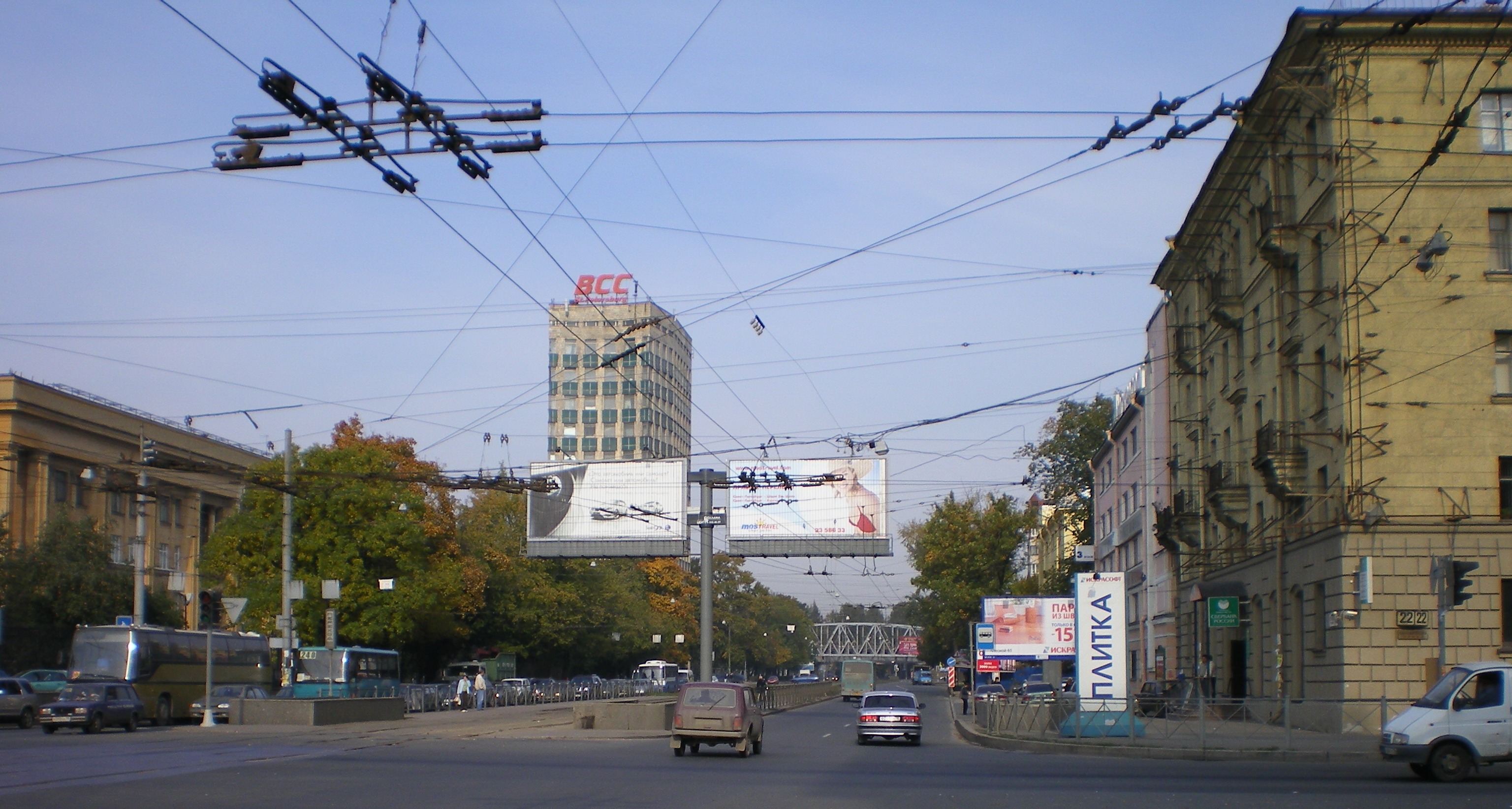

==== SKA - VIFK Swimming pool ====
Built in early 1960s, the reinforced concrete 50-m long swimming pool was the city's largest in 1960s and 1970s. Open to the general public, it was subordinate to Leningrad Military District, then Army Sports Club (Russ. abbr. SKA), and later to Saint Petersburg Military Institute of Physical Education (Russ. abbr. VIFK), whose territory it adjoins.
