= Liteyny Municipal Okrug =

Liteyny Municipal Okrug on the 2006 map of St. Petersburg

Liteyny Municipal Okrug (Russian: муниципа́льный о́круг Лите́йный) is a municipal okrug of Tsentralny District of the federal city of St. Petersburg, Russia. Population: 44,864 (2010 census); 50,567 (2002 census).

The okrug borders the Neva River in the north, Chernyshevskogo Avenue and Vosstaniya Street in the east, and Nevsky Avenue in the south.

Places of interest include the Vosstaniya Square, Liteyny Avenue, and Kutuzov Embankment.
