= Citizens! During shelling this side of the street is the most dangerous =

Public warning message displayed in the USSR during World War II

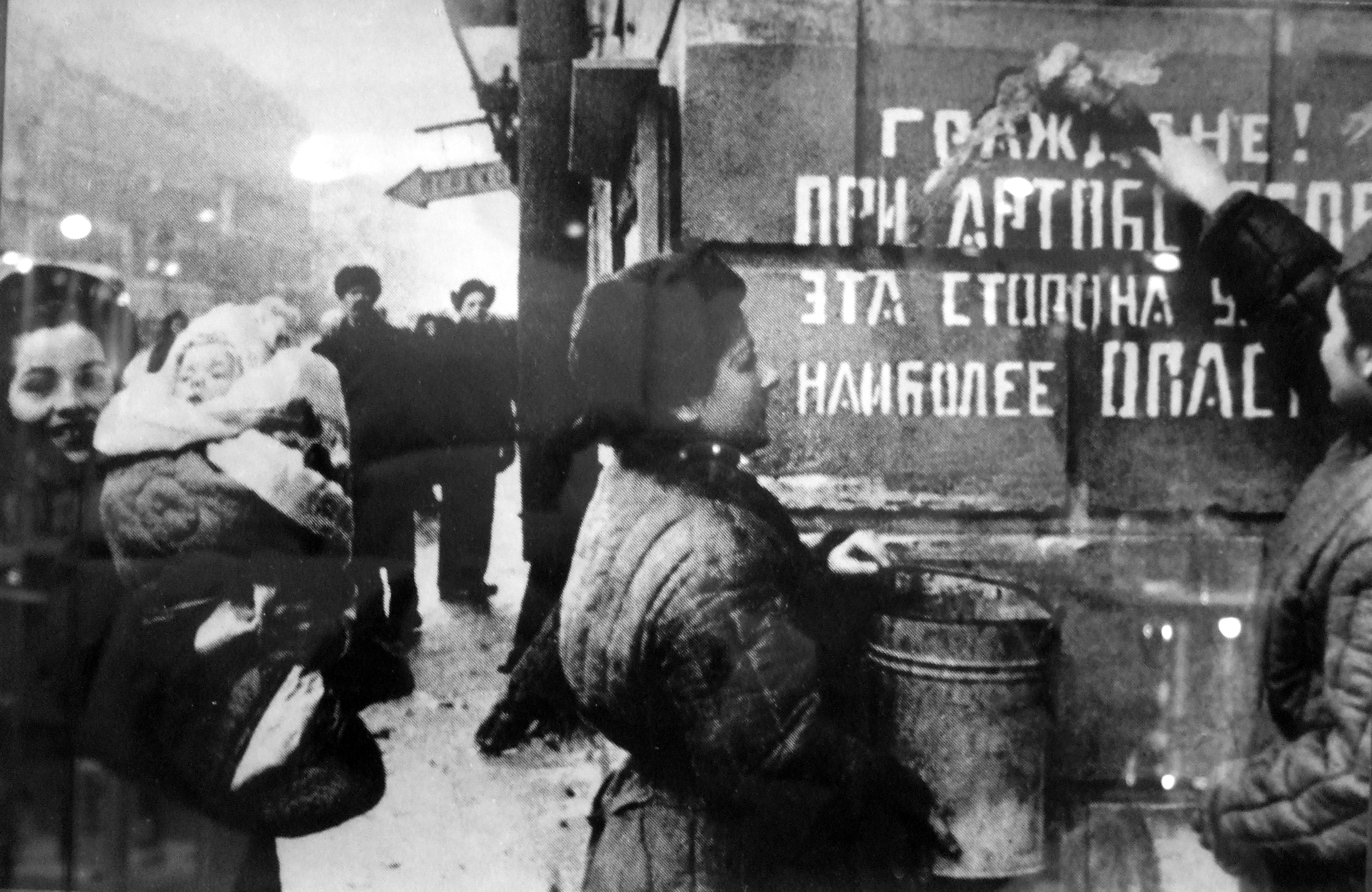
Leningrad, 1944. Citizens celebrate the end of the siege with the removal of the warning

Citizens! During shelling this side of the street is the most dangerous (Russian: Граждане! При артобстреле эта сторона улицы наиболее опасна, romanized: Grazhdane! Pri artobstrele eta storona ulitsy naiboleye opasna) was a public warning message that appeared on the streets of Leningrad during the siege of the city in the Second World War.

The warnings were stencilled on the sides of streets where passers-by were most vulnerable from artillery shells fired from German positions to the south of the city. The Germans fired tens of thousands of shells into the city during the course of the siege, killing and wounding many of its inhabitants. With the final lifting of the siege in 1944 and the retreat of the Germans, the danger from artillery bombardment passed and the warning signs were removed from the walls. They had however become a powerful memory and a symbol of the dangers that the city's inhabitants had faced during the war. Poet Mikhail Dudin made reference to them in his poems, and spearheaded an initiative to have the sign recreated on a building on Nevsky Prospect. It was accompanied with a memorial plaque paying tribute to the bravery of the city's inhabitants during the siege. Over the next decade the inscription was recreated several times, with accompanying plaques, which have become de facto war memorials, described at times as the "most famous monuments from the time of the blockade". Despite this they have been occasionally vandalised or stolen. The wording has also been altered for use as a political statement.

== Artillery bombardment ==
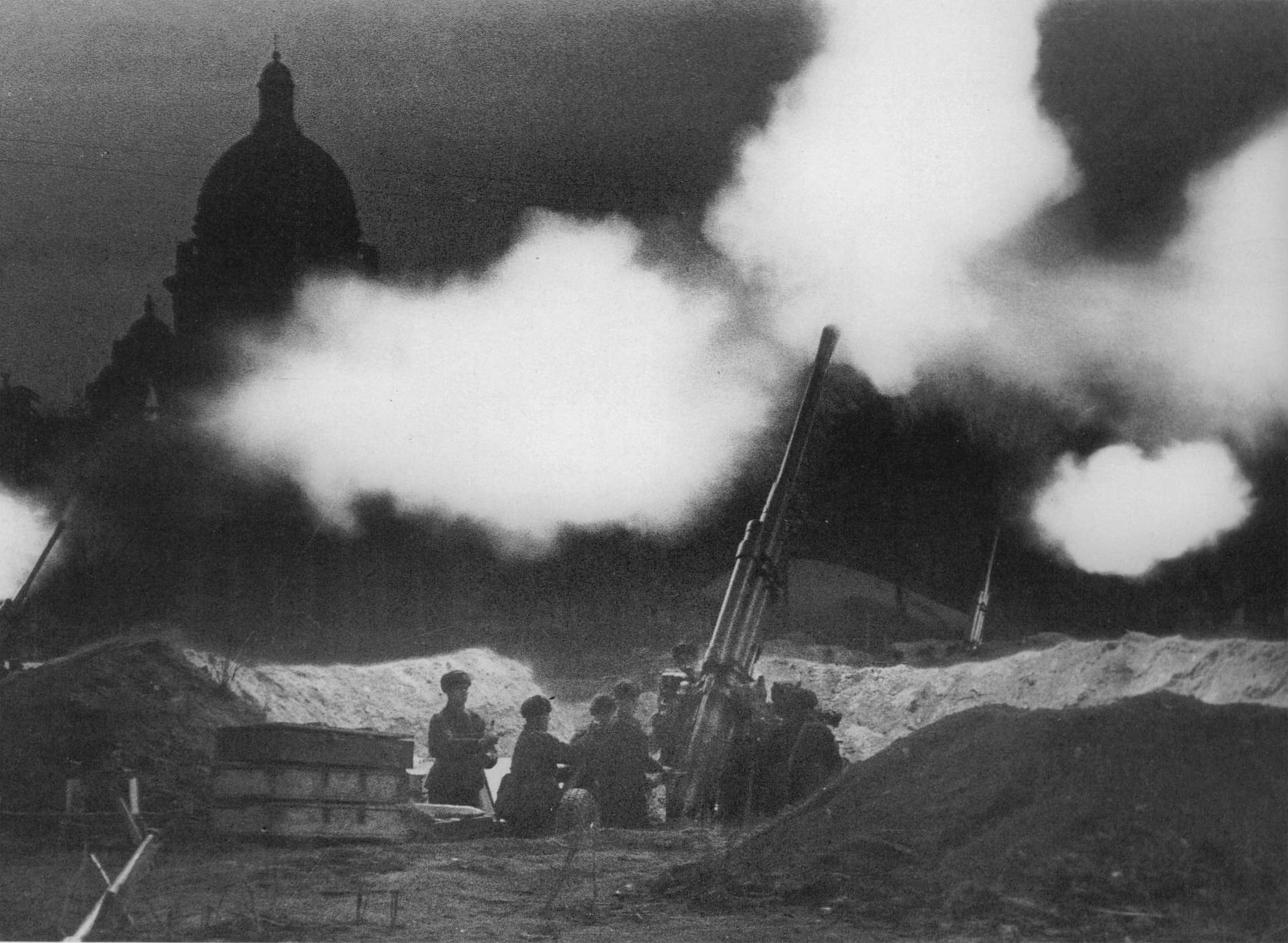
Anti-aircraft guns in action during the defence of the city

German forces had largely completed their encirclement of Leningrad by 8 September 1941. Finnish forces reached the Svir River, some 160 kilometres north-east of the city, but resisted pressure from the Germans to advance further, and did little more than maintain their lines during the years of the siege. Artillery bombardment of the city began on 4 September 1941 and lasted until 22 January 1944. At times the city spent over 18 hours a day under bombardment, with the longest day being 17 September 1941, when the bombardment lasted 18 hours and 33 minutes. Between 4 September and 31 December 1941 some 13,000 shells were fired into the city, with another 21,000 the following year. Between September 1941 and December 1943 the bombardment had killed 5,723 civilians and wounded 20,507.

== Wartime warning ==
The stencilled inscriptions appeared on the northern and north-eastern sides of the streets, as the city was bombarded by long range German artillery from the Pulkovo Heights to the south, and the region of Strelna to the south-west. The regions north of the city were occupied by Finnish troops, who resisted German pressure to bombard the city. The warning also appeared in Kronstadt, this time on the south-western sides of the streets, where the danger came from German shells fired from Petergof. The inscriptions on the northern side of Nevsky Prospekt were made by three members of the local anti-aircraft defence organisation (MPVO) Tatyana Kotova, Anastasia Pashkina and Lyubov Gerasimova. In an interview in 2003 Gerasimova recalled "The commander gave me an half-full paint bucket, a brush and a stencil. But you can't do this task alone - the stencil is big, hard, it should be pressed tightly against the wall so that the paint does not smear, and I woke up Tanya and we went. The paint was red-brown, well, that's how the floors are painted." The warnings became a symbol of the dangers faced by the citizens of Leningrad during the siege. Mikhail Dudin's poem "The Ballad of Raven Mountain" included the lines: "Nevsky was full of inscriptions, Every wall screamed, "Attention! When shelling, This side is dangerous!"

== Postwar memorials ==
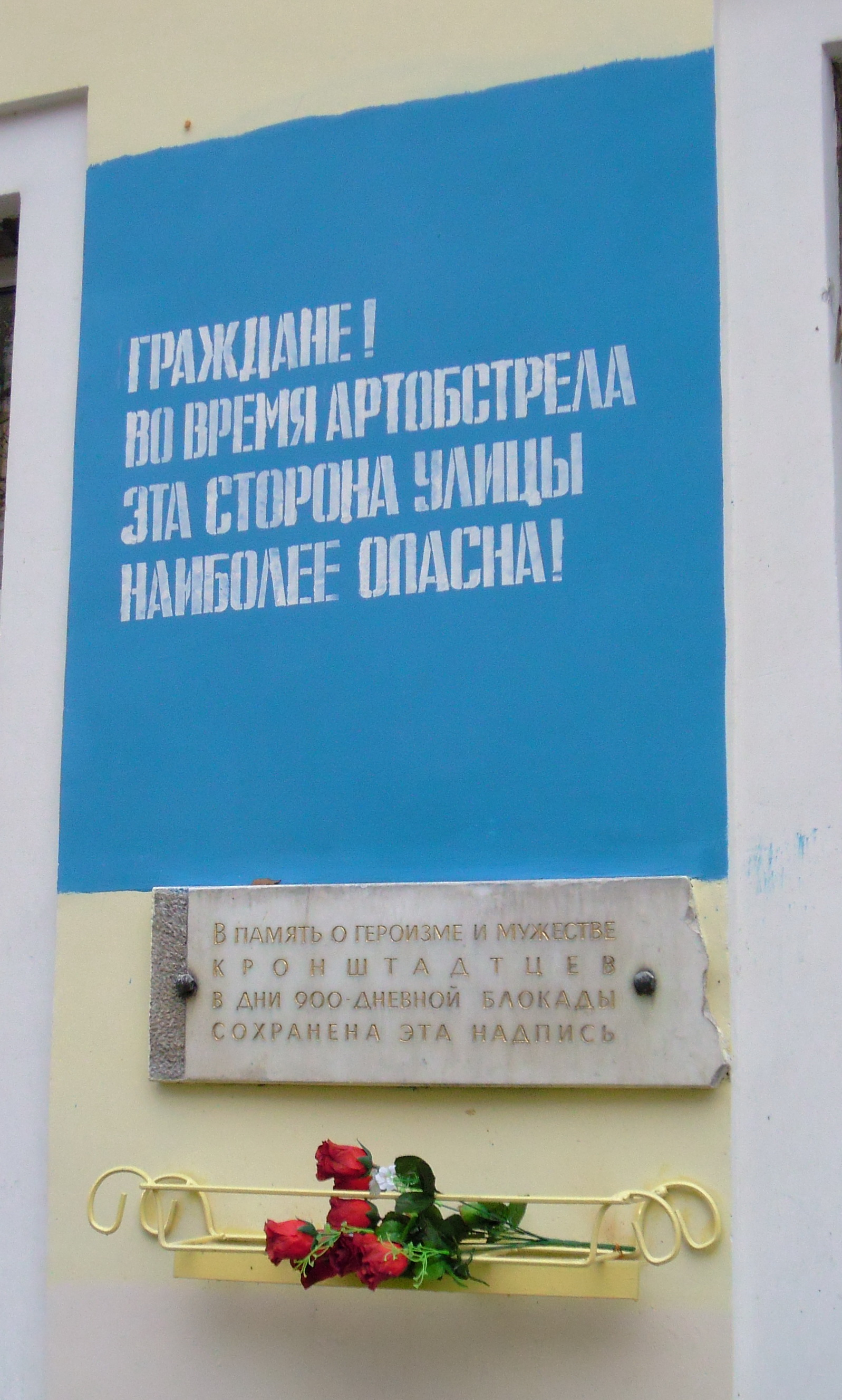
Ammerman Street, No. 25, Kronstadt

The warnings gradually disappeared from the walls of Leningrad after the war. In 1962 the inscription was recreated on school building No. 210 on Nevsky Prospect through the initiative of poet Mikhail Dudin. It was accompanied by a memorial plaque by architect V. D. Popov. Over the next few years several other instances of the inscription were recreated in other locations across the city, including one on the House of Specialists at 61 Lesnoy Prospect, Building 1, in 1968, and on House Number 7 on the 22nd Line of Vasilyevsky Island in 1969. The inscription is also found on the island of Kronstadt, having been restored in 1973 on Number 17/14 Posadskaya Street and Number 25 Ammerman Street. In each case the present day inscriptions are white stencilled lettering on a blue background. The Kronstadt examples differ slightly from those on the mainland, reading in Russian as Граждане! Во время артобстрела эта сторона улицы наиболее опасна as opposed to Граждане! При артобстреле эта сторона улицы наиболее опасна, though with the meaning and English translation the same.

Each instance is accompanied by a memorial plaque by A. I. Ivanov and R. I. Gehlershtein, which copied Popov's original. These feature the text "In memory of the heroism and courage of Leningraders during the 900-day siege of the city, this inscription is preserved" (В память о героизме и мужестве ленинградцев в дни 900-дневной блокады города сохранена эта надпись). The text on the memorial plaques in Kronstadt differ slightly: "In memory of the heroism and courage of the Kronstadters in the days of the 900-day blockade, this inscription is preserved" (В память о героизме и мужестве кронштадтцев в дни 900-дневной блокады сохранена эта надпись). Interfax has called them the "most famous monuments from the time of the blockade". They are frequently the site of commemorations of the siege, and in January 2019 Governor of Saint Petersburg Alexander Beglov laid flowers at the inscription on Nevsky Prospect.

The inscriptions have occasionally been the targets of vandalism. In September 2018 the memorial plaque accompanying the inscription at 22nd Line, Number 7, was stolen during renovation work. In November 2018 the inscription on Nevsky Prospect was daubed with white paint. The warning has also been adapted for use as a political protest. In 2010 the slogan "Citizens! Under V.I. Matvienko either side of the street is dangerous to life!" (Граждане! При В.И. Матвиенко любая сторона улицы опасна для жизни!) appeared, criticising Governor of Saint Petersburg Valentina Matviyenko for failing to clear the city streets of snow and hanging icicles.

=== Existing inscriptions ===
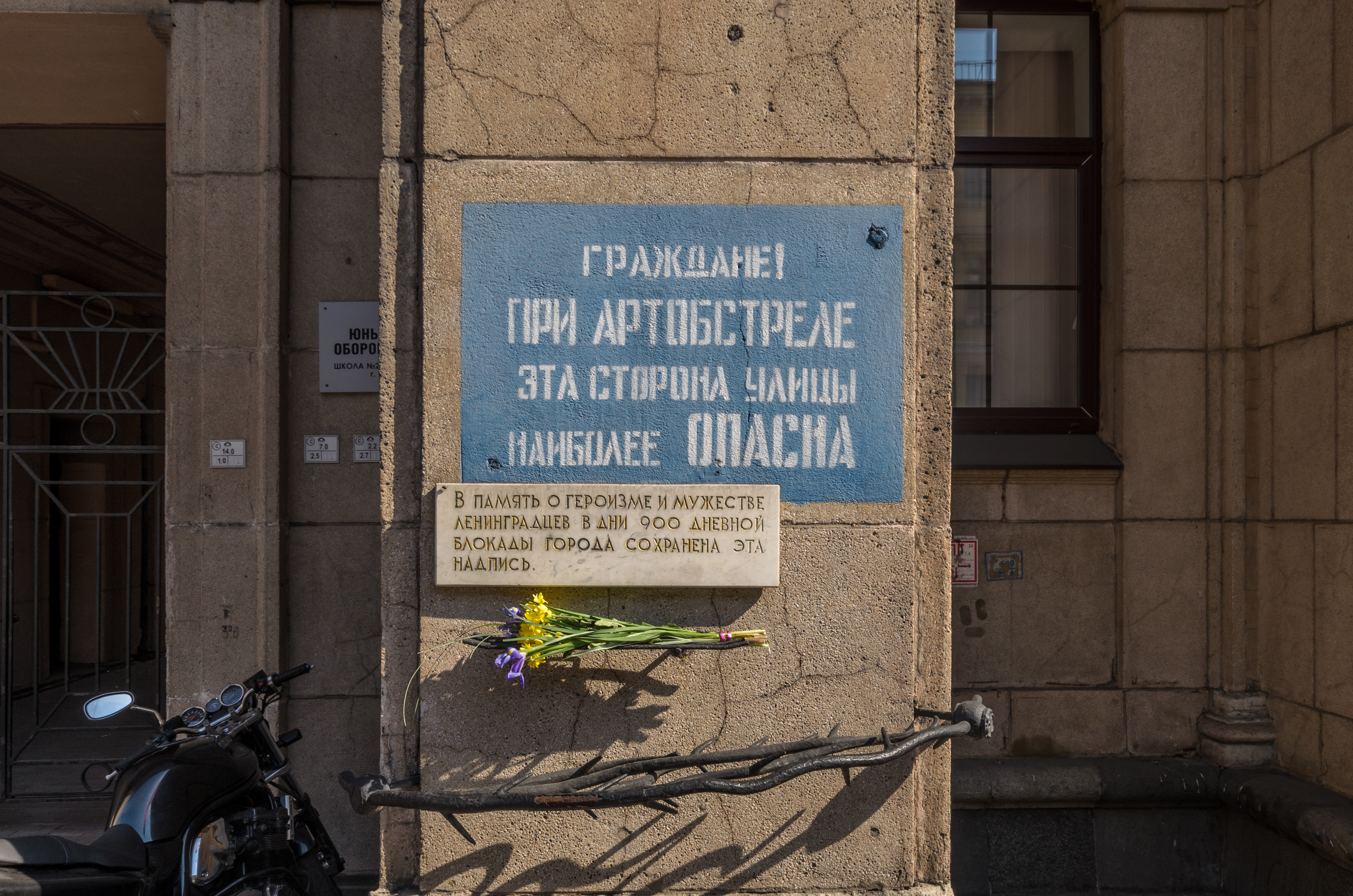
Nevsky Prospect, Number 14

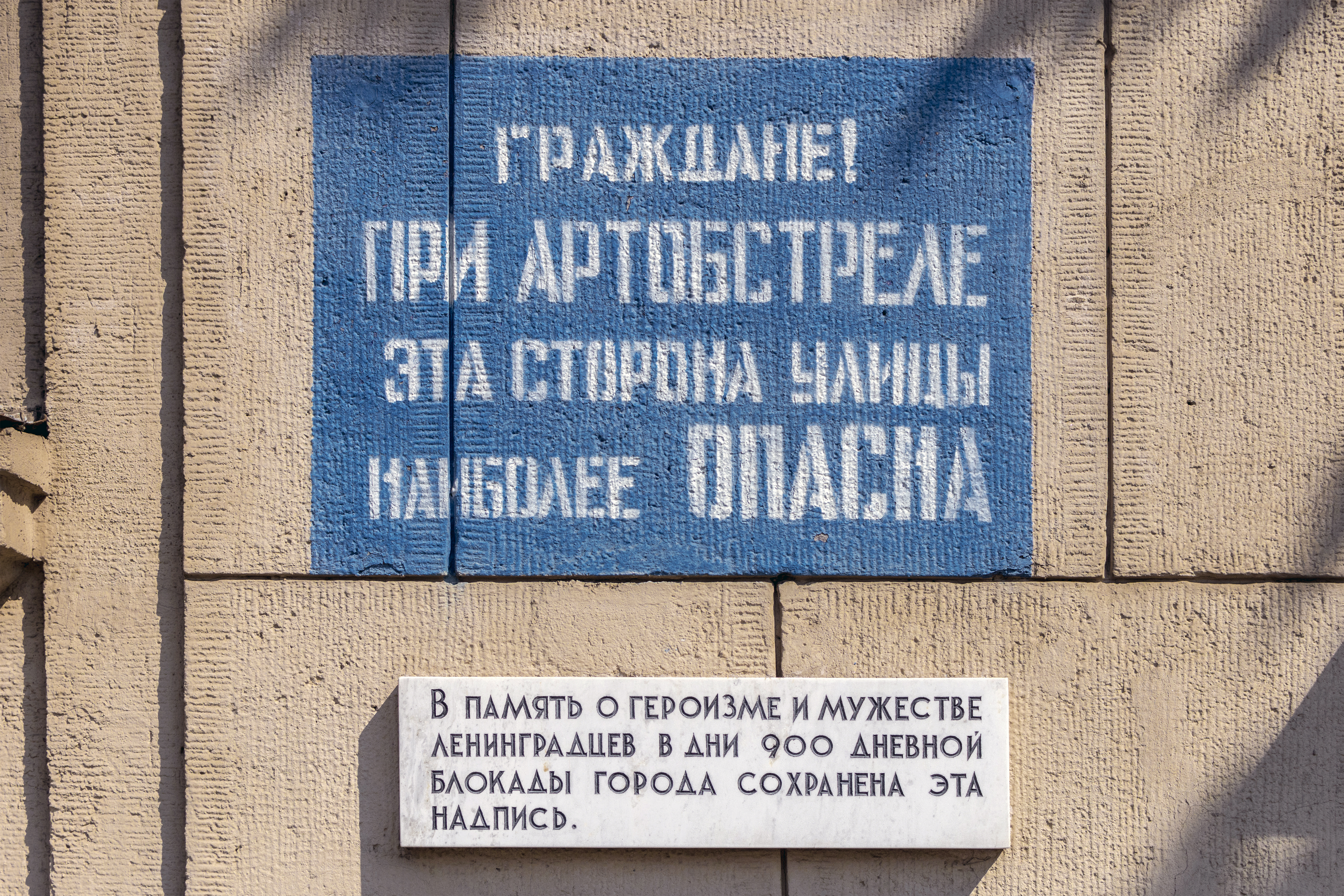
House of Specialists at Number 61, Lesnoy Prospect

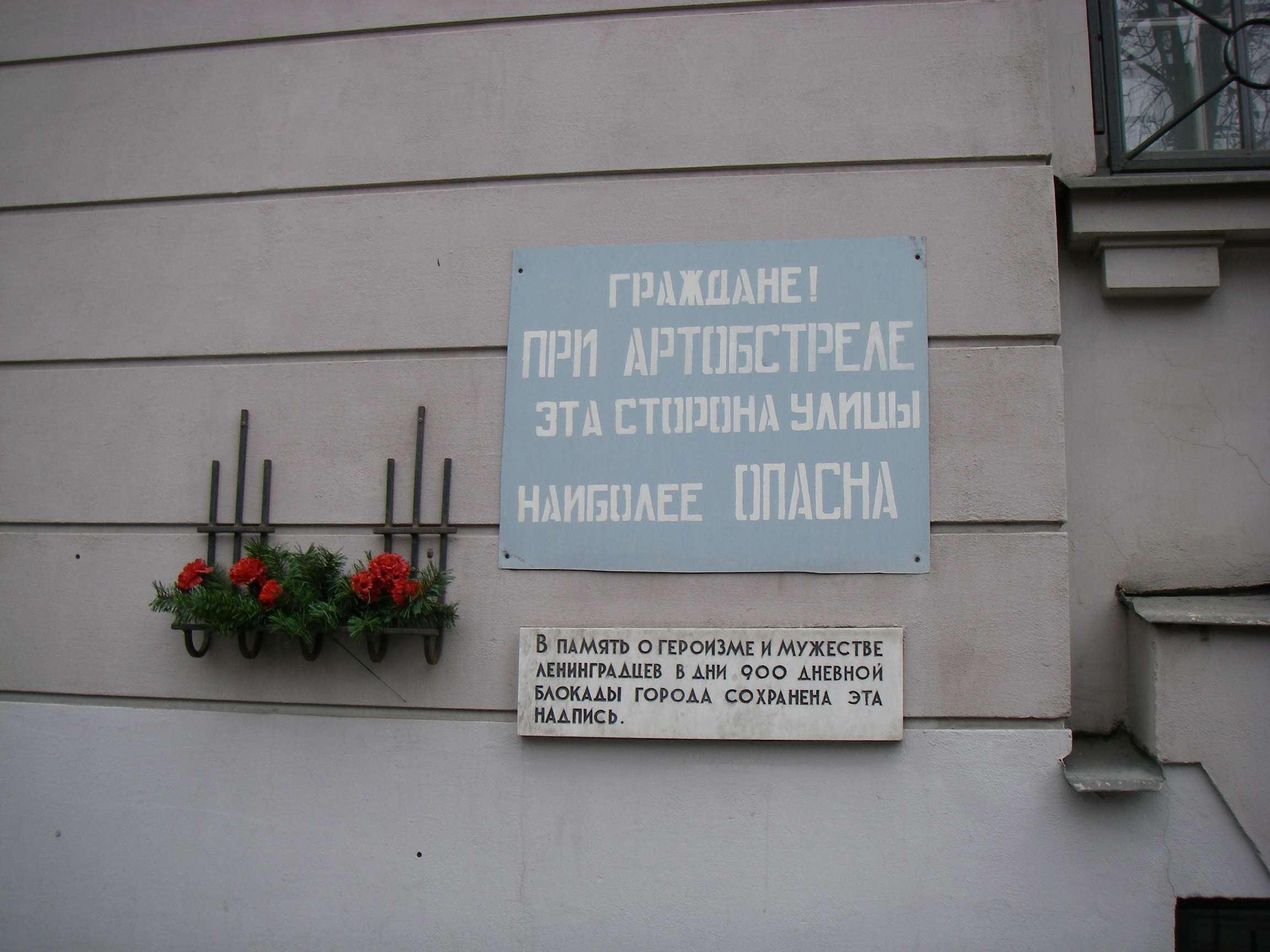
22nd Line, Number 7

== See also ==
- Kilroy was here - US Army meme during World War 2
