= House of Specialists (Lesnoy Prospect, Saint Petersburg) =

Compound of apartment buildings in Saint Petersburg, Russia

- Дом специалистов (Russian)
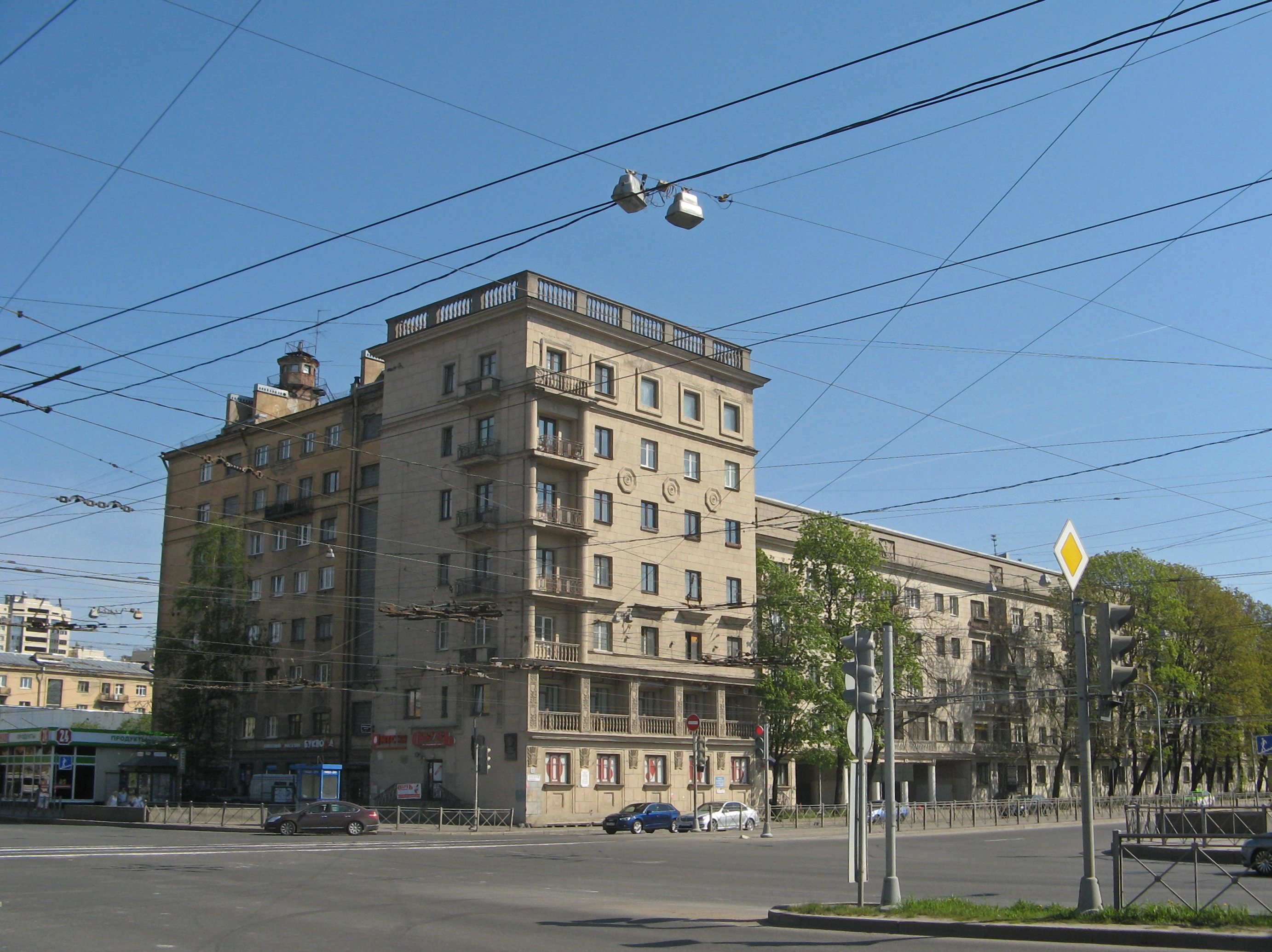
- House of Specialists. Building 1 from the corner of Lesnoy Prospect avenue and Kantemirovskaya street

General information
- Status: Local cultural heritage object 7800000004
- Type: Apartment building
- Architectural style: Postconstructivism
- Location: Sampsoniyevskoye Municipal Okrug, Vyborgsky District, Saint Petersburg, Saint Petersburg, Russia, 61 Lesnoy Prospect / 23-25х Kantemirovskaya Street (Saint Petersburg), Saint Petersburg, Russia
- Coordinates: 59°59′03″N 30°20′35″E
- Construction started: 1934
- Construction stopped: 1937

Design and construction
- Architects: Grigoriy A. Simonov, Boris Rubanenko, Lev K. Abramov, Tamara Katsenelenbogen

House of Specialists

House of Specialists (Russian: Дом специалистов) at 61 Lesnoy Prospect avenue in Saint Petersburg, Russia, is a compound of three apartment buildings in the city's northern / northeastern Vyborgskiy district designed and constructed in 1930s under the Soviet government decision to improve living conditions of professionals in a number of cities, building Houses for specialists (USSR) (workmen were given new accommodations too). Among the residents of the house were many notable scientists, engineers and several art workers, and the compound was entered into the cultural heritage list by an act of the city's Legislative Assembly in 1999.

== History ==
In early 1930s the city block on odd-numbered side of Kantemirovskaya street immediately east of Lesnoy Prospect was filled with two sets of apartment buildings differing in the degree of built-in conveniences. In the southern part of the block the 6 residential 5-storeyed buildings of No 59 Lesnoy Prospect avenue constructed for the district textile mills workers did not have what their nextdoor neighbors from the three houses of No. 61 Lesnoy received as members of a higher strata of professionals: flats not shared, running hot water and bathtubs with showers in them, lifts, rubbish chutes etc. These specially designed better conditions were provided for by the national government decision of 1932 to build apartment houses for specialists - several in each of a number of big cities.

== Famous residents of the House of Specialists ==
No 61 by Lesnoy Prospect / 21 by Kantemirovskaya Street House of Specialists accommodated dozens of significant engineers, factory managers, scientists in various fields, and several cultural figures. As such, it was entered by an act of the city's Legislative Assembly of 1999 on the list of local monuments of culture and history, being a Monument of Russia's cultural heritage No. 7800000004. The list of monuments includes this house as the one where lived the following notable people:

- Nathan Altman, a Russian and Soviet avant-garde artist, Cubist painter, stage designer and book illustrator. Lived in Building 1 in the former apartment 157 in 1937-41 and 1944-70.
- Mikhail Aleksandrovich Bonch-Bruevich, a professor of radiophysics and engineer who developed various types of vacuum tubes and laid foundations for national radio broadcasting. Lived in the building in 1934-40, apartment No. 115 (formerly 33) of Building 2.
- Aleksandr Kuprin, a Russian writer, in 1938 on his return from emigration until his death, Building 3, apartment 236, formerly 212.
- Igor Kurchatov - a leading Soviet nuclear physicist.
- Vitaly Khlopin, a pioneering researcher in Soviet radiochemistry who produced significant preparations of radium, was on the Soviet atomic project and whose name was given to V. G. Khlopin Radium Institute. Lived in Building 1 in 1941, 1945-50.
- Vladimir Voronin, a Soviet Arctic sea captain

Memorial plaques have been mounted on the building in honour of Khlopin, Altman, Bonch-Bruevich, and in memory of the Siege of Leningrad a wall sign warning that this side of Lesnoy Prospect was the more dangerous one during the enemy artillery fire.

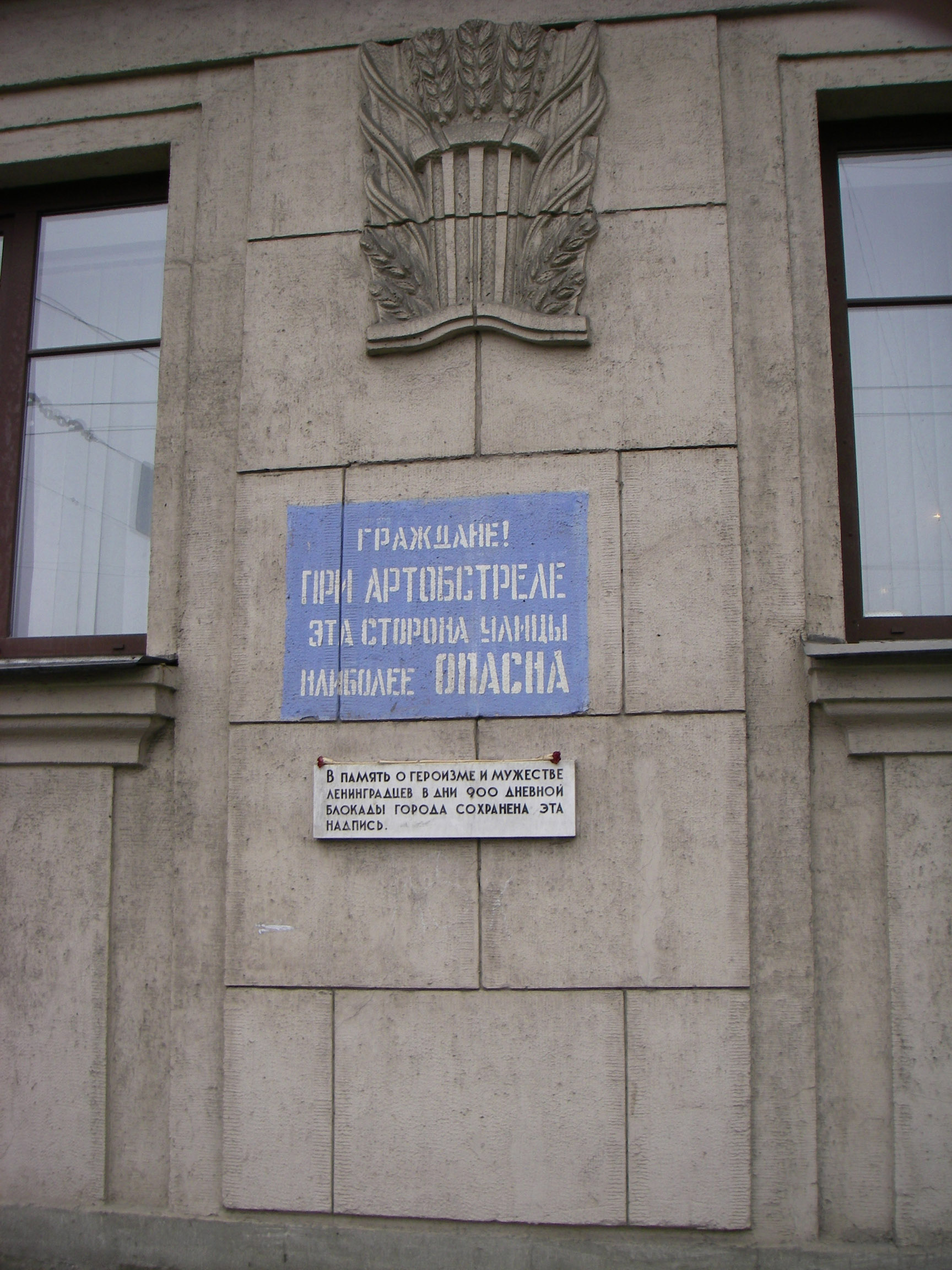
Citizens! During shelling this side of the street is the most dangerous

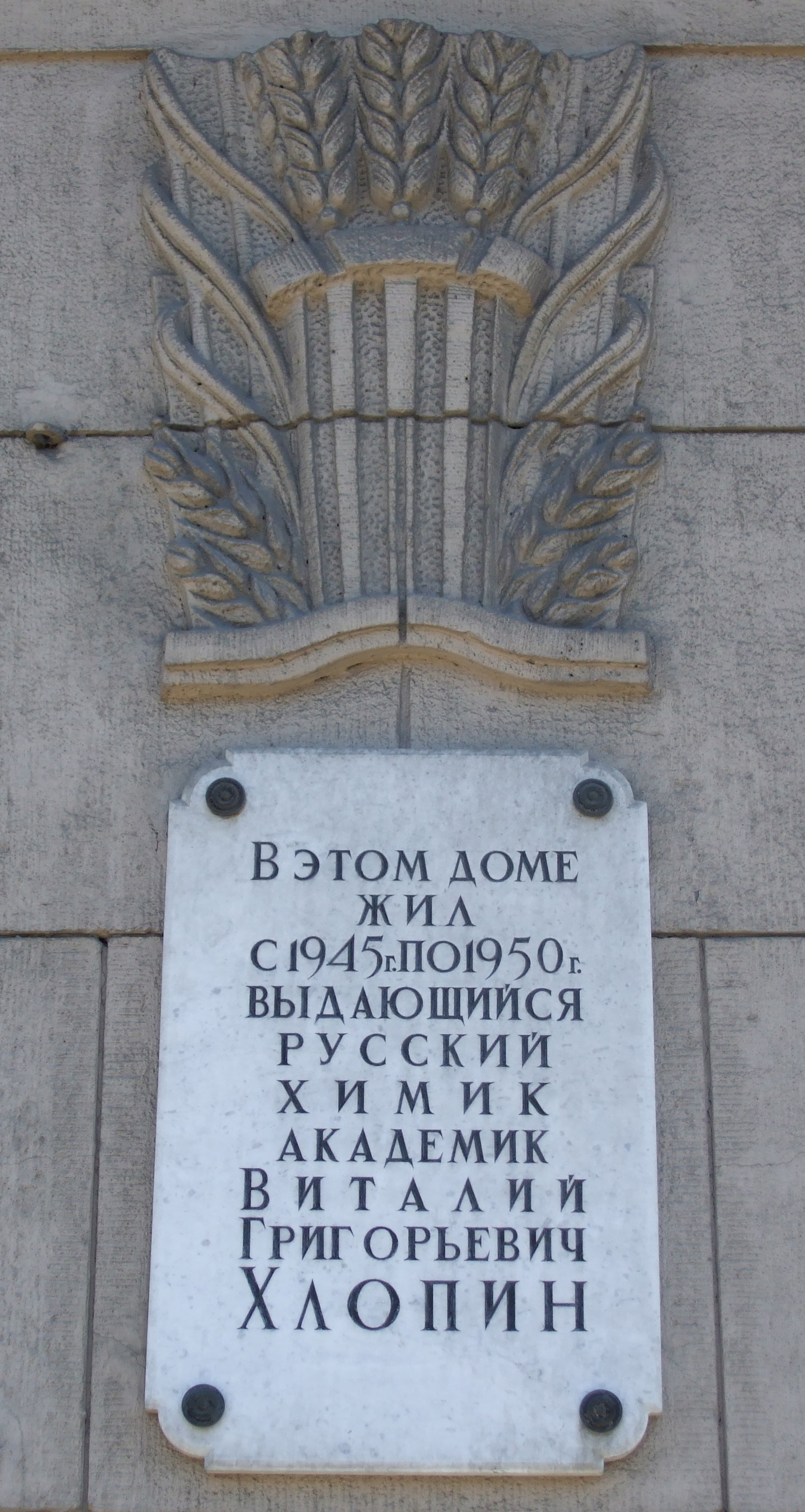
Memorial plaque for the chemist Academician Vitaliy Khlopin

== Plaques in memory of victims of repression ==
=== Installing memorial plaques ===
In the 2nd half of 2010s less noticeable smaller memorial plaques were also mounted on the building to commemorate its residents who fell victim of Stalin's time purges. Their names were established by the city's civil activity organisations dedicated to legal rehabilitation and commemoration of innocent people who were oppressed from the 1930s to the 1950s and Vozvraschionniye imena (Returned Names) history research center set up to find names, compile biographies and keep the memory of Russia's victims of XX century's wars and purges working at the National Library of Russia in Saint Petersburg. The research center's website also hosts online searchable copies of the city's Memory Books with names of victims and survivors of the Siege of Leningrad and repressions that include the names of the house residents, and offers links to other federal and city archive databases websites. Modest memorial plaques of the same kind have been placed on the city's old buildings in accordance with the Last Address civic initiative.

=== Dismantling memorial plaques ===
34 “Last address” plates with the names of the residents of the house, who became victims of repressions during the Soviet era, disappeared from the House of Specialists in 2023.

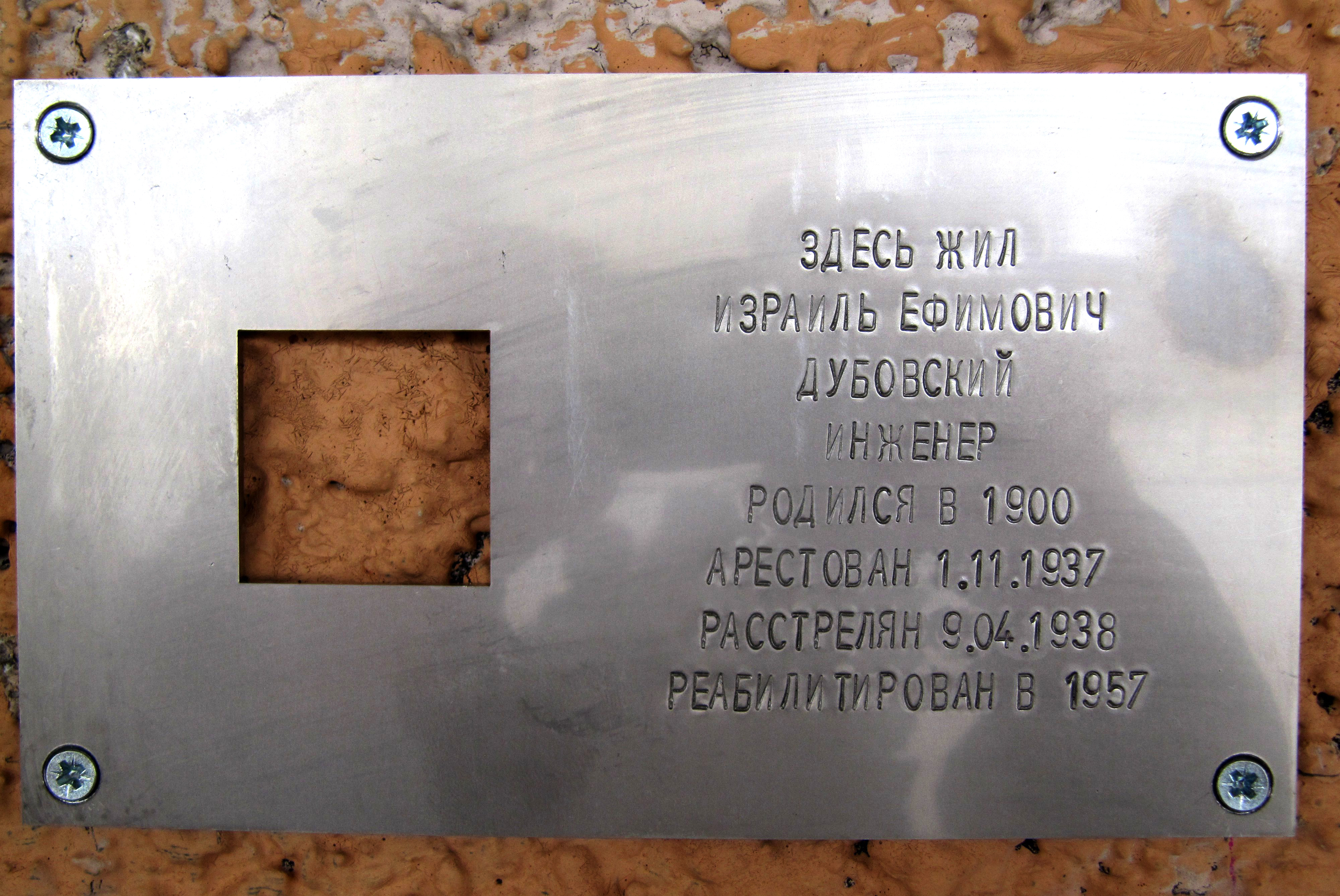
Last Address personal memorial plaques

.

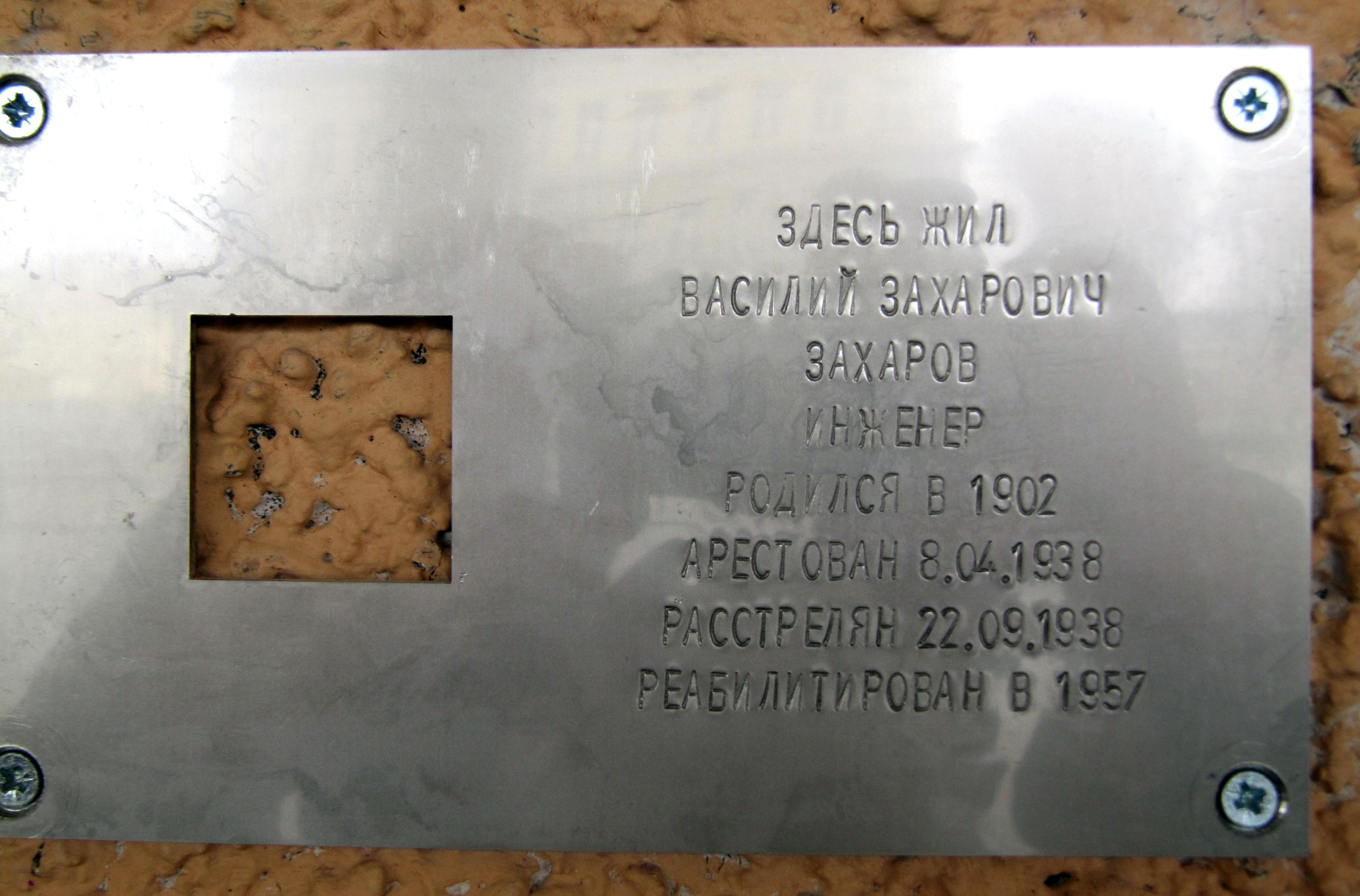

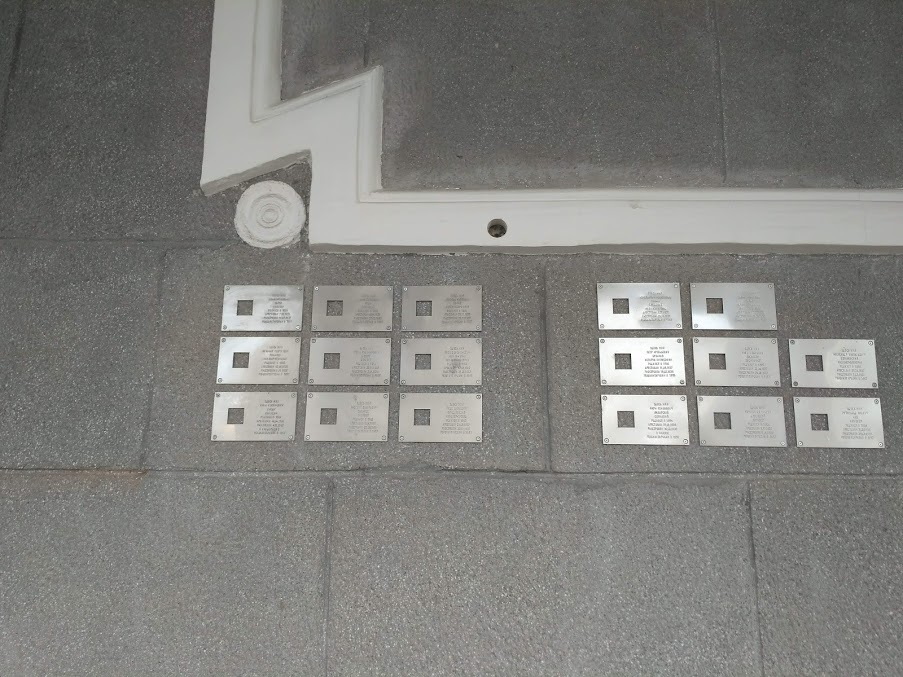

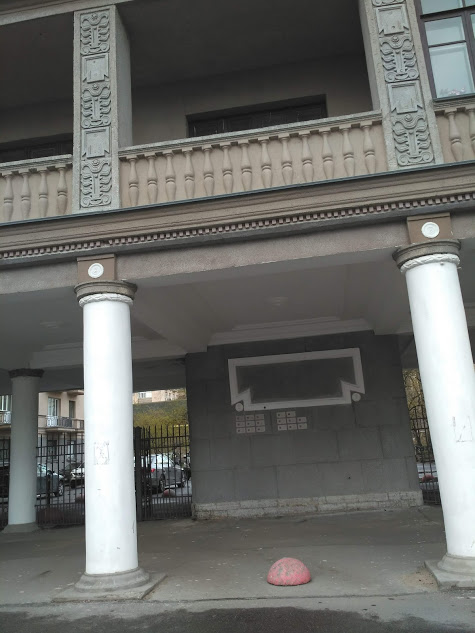

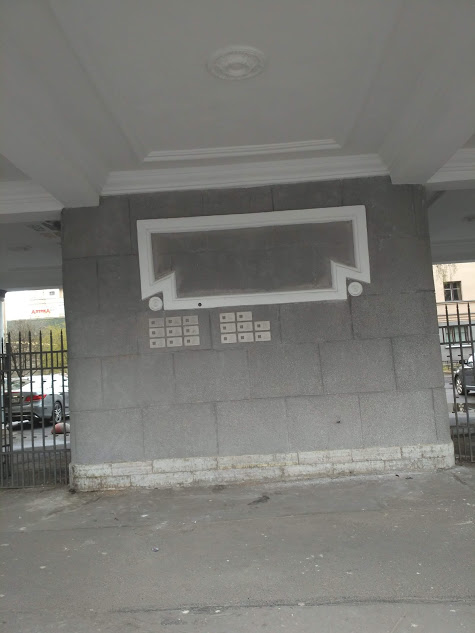
