= Lesnoy Prospect (Saint Petersburg) =

Street in Saint Petersburg, Russia

Coordinates: 59.9764°N 30.3447°E

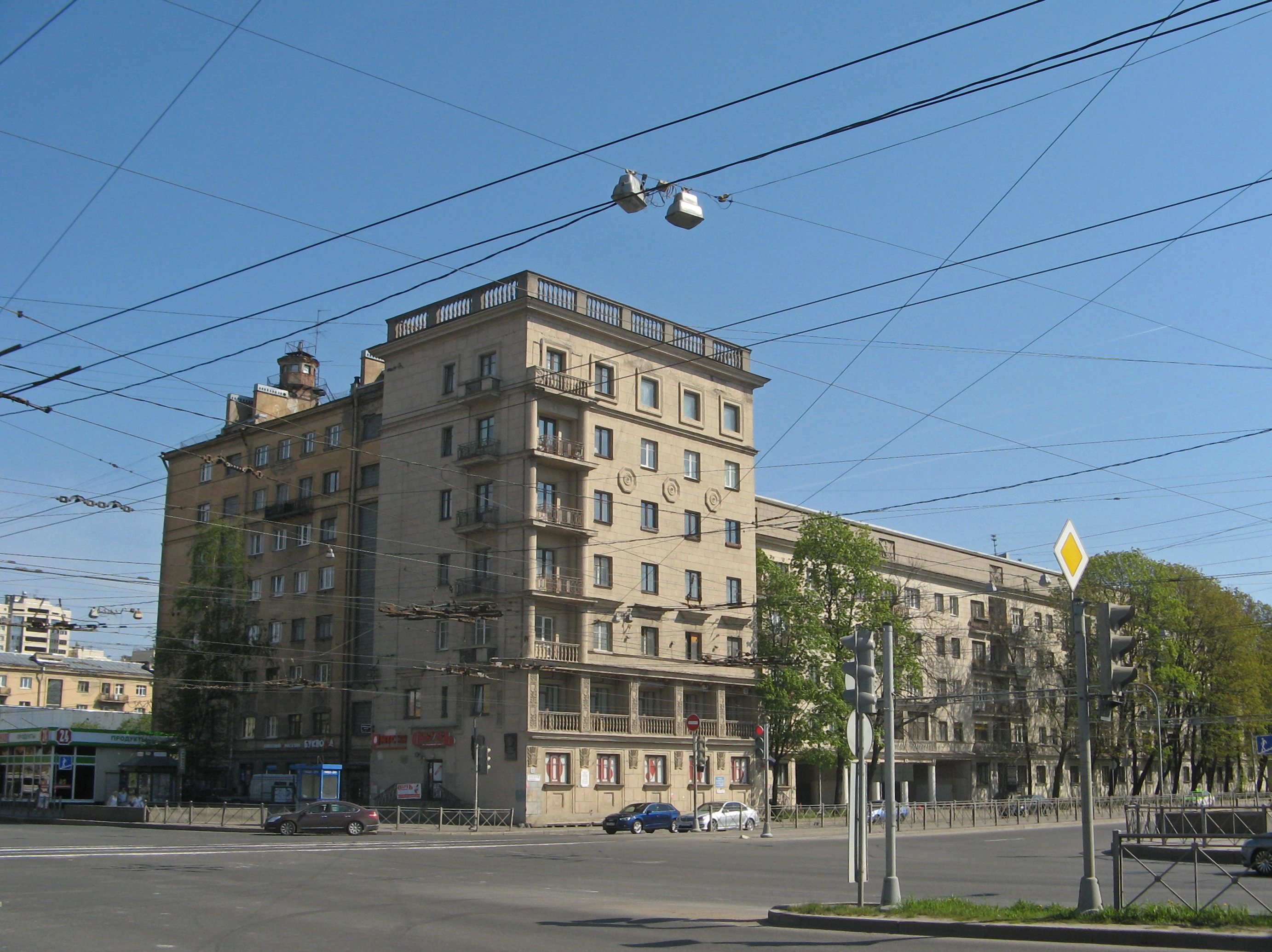
- House of Specialists. No. 61 Building 1 from the corner of Lesnoy Prospect avenue and Kantemirovskaya Street
- Interactive map of Lesnoy Prospect
- Native name: Лесной проспект (Russian)
- Former name(s): Nystadt street (southern part), Mezhevaya Street (northern part)
- Namesake: Saint-Petersburg State Forestry University
- Location: Saint Petersburg

Lesnoy Prospect or prospekt (Russian: Лесной проспект, from adject. lesnoy "of forest") is a major longitudinal street (prospekt) of the right-hand Vyborg Side of the river Neva delta in Saint Petersburg, Russia, connecting the city's downtown with the central part of its northern Vyborgskiy District - the namesake Lesnoy neighborhood of the Saint Petersburg Forestry University (formerly Forst-Institut, Lesnoy Institute), founded in early 19 century and becoming a local landmark. With the growth of the city and its suburbs, the avenue takes over it and adjacent streets automobile traffic to further northeastern districts. The whole of the avenue's left-hand side belongs to Vyborgskiy District and its Sampsoniyevskoye Municipal Okrug, while the southern part of the avenue's right-hand side is in Kalininskiy District of Saint Petersburg.

From its southern beginning at Saint Petersburg Military Medical Academy to its northern end at the park of Saint-Petersburg State Forestry University the avenue features a number of historic buildings and public gardens.

== Links ==
- The avenue's buildings on Citywalls.ru
- The avenue on Encyclopedia of Saint Petersburg (in Russian)
