= Kantemirovskaya Street (Saint Petersburg) =

Street in Saint Petersburg, Russia

Kantemirovskaya street
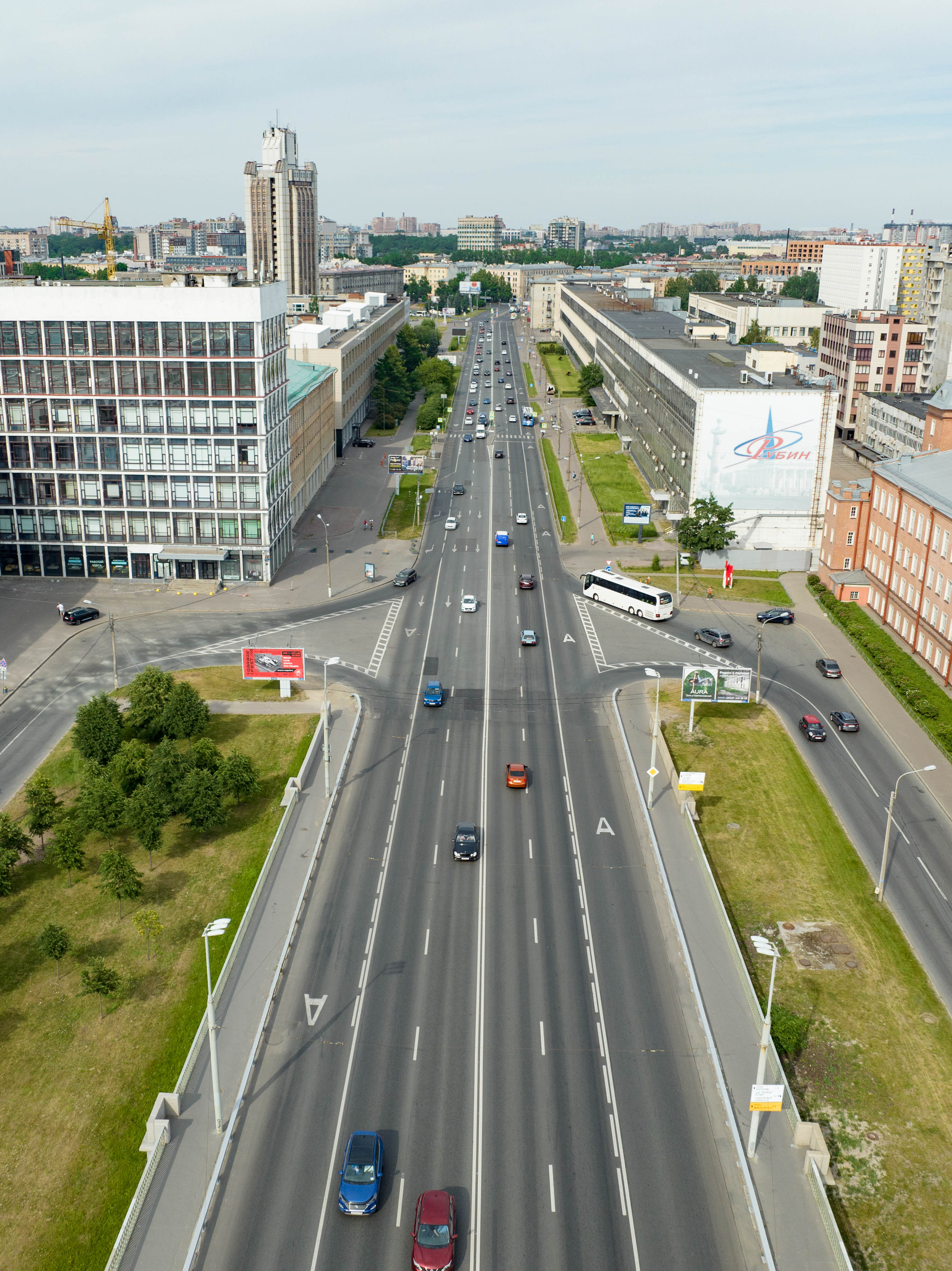
- Aerial view from Kantemirovsky bridge
- Interactive map of Kantemirovskaya street
- Native name: Кантемировская улица (Russian)
- Former names: Flugov lane, Kosygin street
- Namesake: Kantemirovka
- Location: Vyborgskiy district, partly Primorskiy district of Saint Petersburg, Saint Petersburg, Russia
- Postal code: 194100
- Nearest Saint Petersburg Metro station: Lesnaya
- Coordinates: 59°59′6″N 30°20′31″E

Other
- Status: regional significance

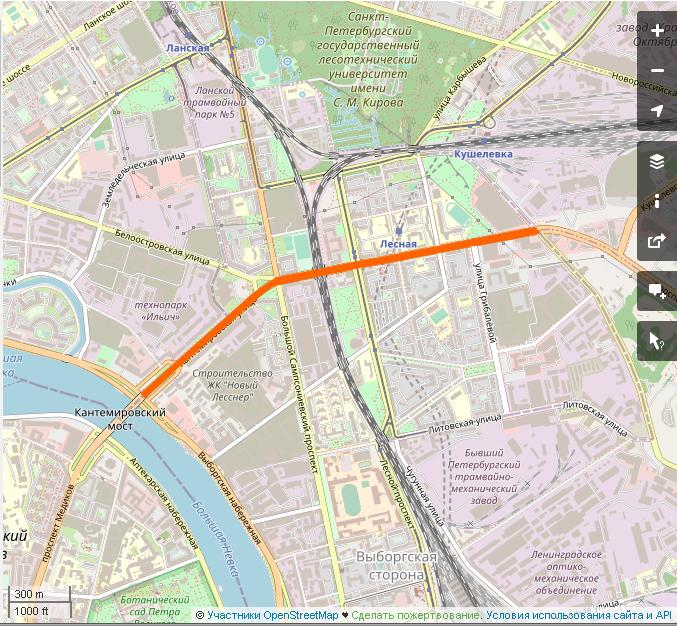
The street on OpenStreetMap

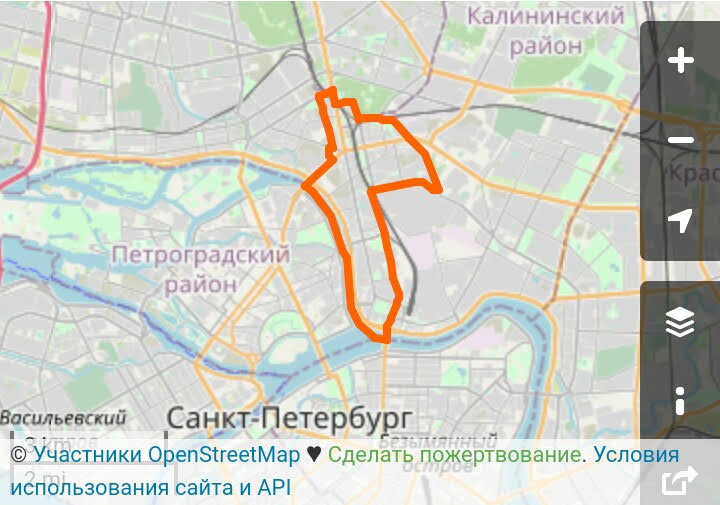
Sampsonievskoe municipal okrug border map from openstreetmap

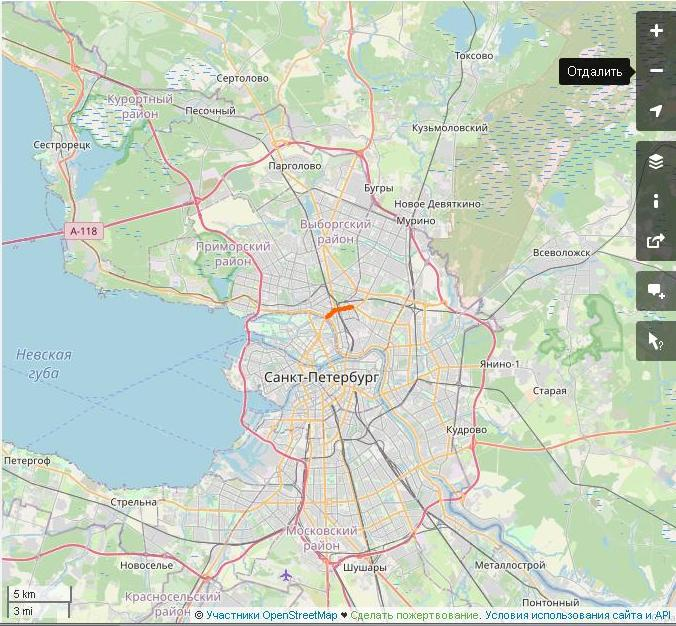
Kantemirovskaya street on the map of Saint Petersburg

Kantemirovskaya street (Kantemirovskaya ulitsa, Russian: Кантемировская улица) is a motor road of regional significance in Sampsonievskoye municipal okrug in Vyborgskiy district and partly in Primorskiy district of Saint Petersburg, Russia. It became rather important for the city's north and east and busy with traffic after its 1980s reconstruction and completion of Kantemirovsky bridge as a transit link between Vyborg Side (Vyborgskiy, Kalininskiy and Primorskiy districts) and Petrograd Side. The street got its current name in honour of the 1942 Soviet victory in the battle of Kantemirovka town in Voronezh Oblast province in southern Russia.

== Naming and history ==
=== Names ===
A street of the same name is in Moscow. Both streets got their names in the Soviet times in connection with a Red Army victory in 1942 during the World War II against Nazi Germany troops in the battle for the railway station of Kantemirovka in Voronezh Oblast province, with the street in then Leningrad named Kantemirovskaya in 1952. The Saint Petersburg street had its preceding history under a different name as Flugov pereulok since early 19 century, while its Moscow namesake exists since 1965 and is named not after the town (railway station) itself, but after the Soviet Army unit that liberated the settlement and was for that inducted into Guards and in 1946 got its honorific Kantemirovskaya - in full, 4th Guards Kantemirovskaya of the Order of Lenin and Red Banner Tank Division.

The street in Leningrad, in its turn, lent its name to Kantemirovskiy bridge at its southwest tip connecting the area with more central Petrograd Side of the city. The Moscow street gave its name to its existing neighbourhood metro station, while in Saint Petersburg, given its much slower pace of underground railroad system construction than in Moscow, there have been mostly long-term plans to build its Ring Line that would have its own Kantemirovskaya station near the eponymous street and bridge. It was planned as the only station of the line without interchange to other lines.

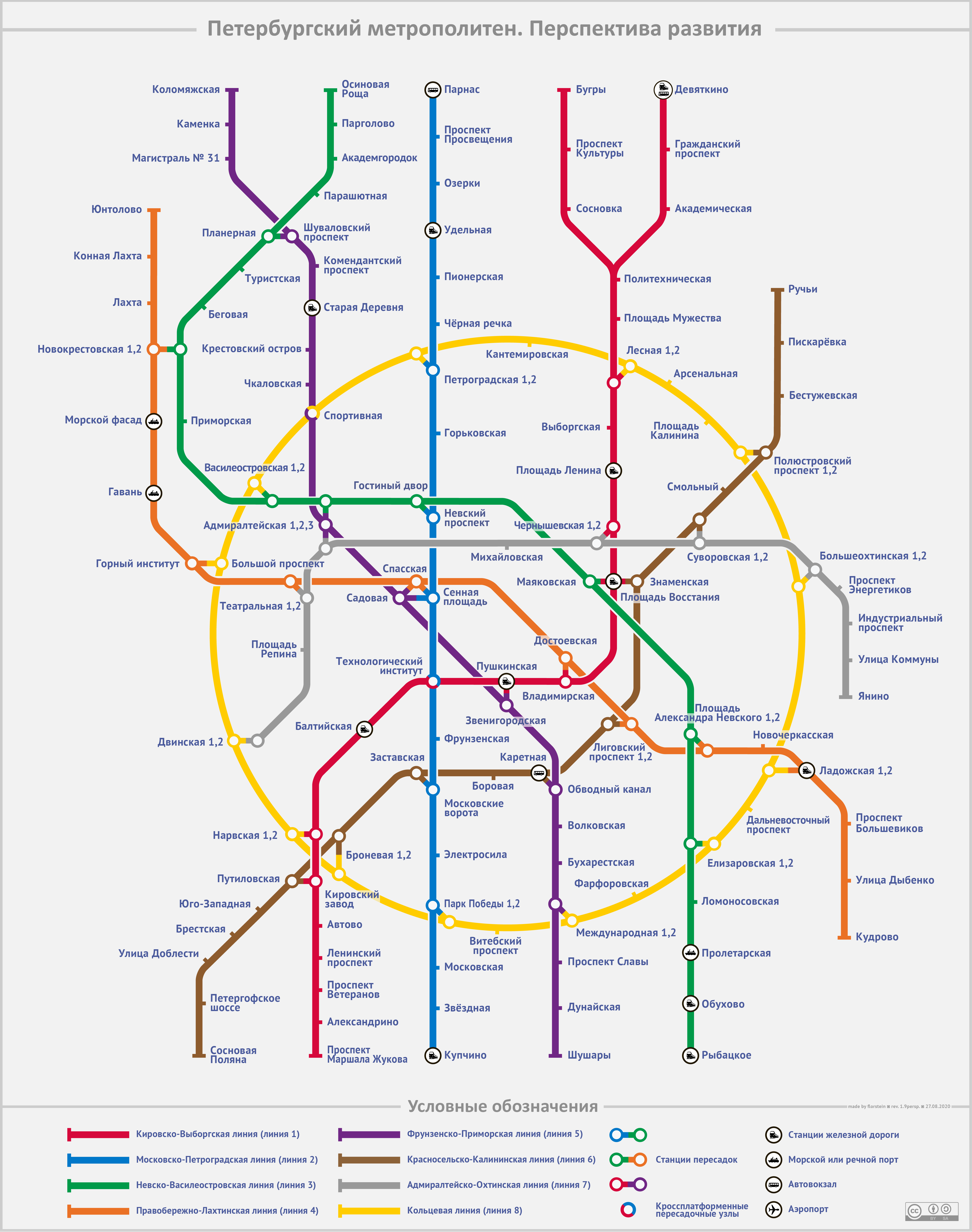
Saint Petersburg metro future map

On 1 June 1981 the street was renamed ulitsa Kosygina ("Kosygin Street") in memory of the country's (USSR) prime minister Alexey N. Kosygin who had died a year before and whose early stages of career included work at a textile mill in the neighborhood. But the change in the street name was not welcomed by local residents, and the following year, on 25 October 1982, the street, on popular demand, was returned its name Kantemirovskaya, while Kosygin's name was given to a large avenue in a newly built-up residential area in a different, Krasnogvardeysky, district of the city, in the Porokhoviye area of the former gunpowder mills.

Before 1953 the street had the name Flugov pereulok ("Flug's Lane") after the late 18 - early 19 century industrialist of German origin Heinrich Gabriel Pflug (Russified: Gavrila Ivanovich Flug, Гаврила Иванович Флюг, also other spellings were in contemporary sources, 1745-1833) who owned a local landmark, the cordage factory near the embankment. Pflug's matrilineal great greatgrandson was the renowned Russian painter Ilya Glazunov, whose career started in mid-XX century. The businessman's family was friends with their contemporary artist renowned for his portrait and genre painting Pavel Fedotov and acted and sat for some of his works.

The street is one of the oldest in this area on the former remote outskirts of the city. The name Flygovsky Lane has existed since the 1830s and initially referred to the section from Vyborgskaya Embankment to Bolshoy Sampsonievsky Prospect. The road from Bolshoy Sampsonievsky Prospect to Pargolovskaya Street from 1850s until 5 March 1871 was called at first the Great Murinskaya Road or Murinskaya Street, then simply Murinskaya Street (there have been other streets named for the estate / village of Murino (now town) located to the northeast of the city).

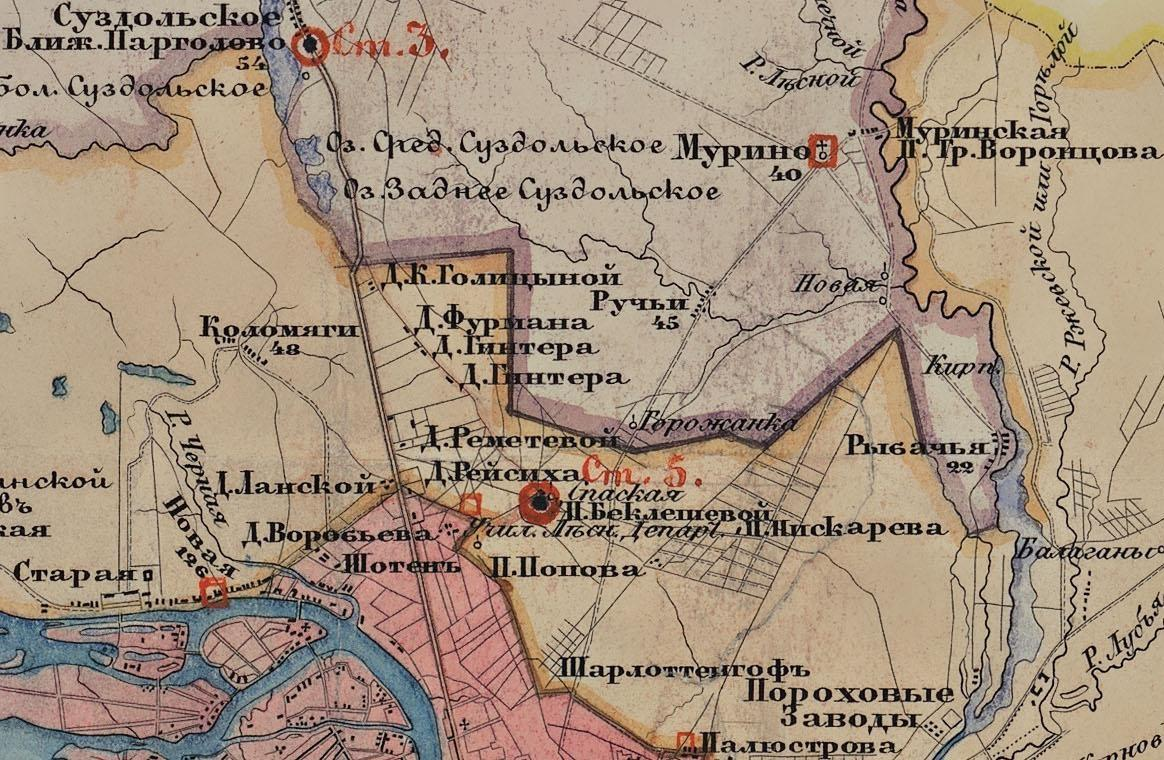
Northeastern part and suburbs of 1854 Saint Petersburg with Murino estate in a red rectangle

On 5 March 1871 both of these sections were named Flyugovsky Lane. At the end of the 19th century, another section was added to the street - up to the current Kharchenko Street (formerly Antonovsky Lane after a local landowner); the name was changed to Flyugov Lane.

=== History of development ===
Located in an outlying industrial area of the city built up with factories and housing for their workers, the street as such has preserved out of its pre-Soviet industrial buildings just a former cotton mill of a merchant of German descent von Hueck (Russified as Гук Guk) and then a British Russian merchant Joseph Cheshire, later merged into a joint stock company with Saint Petersburg factories of two other entrepreneurs - Russian lvan Voronin and German Jacob Lutsch, nationalised after the Bolshevik Revolution and renamed Kransniy mayak (Rus. Красный маяк "Red Lighthouse") - and its workers' living house. After the textile factory failed in post-Soviet time, its manufacturing buildings were refurbished to house a part of Saint Petersburg campus of a post-1991 Russian university Higher School of Economics.

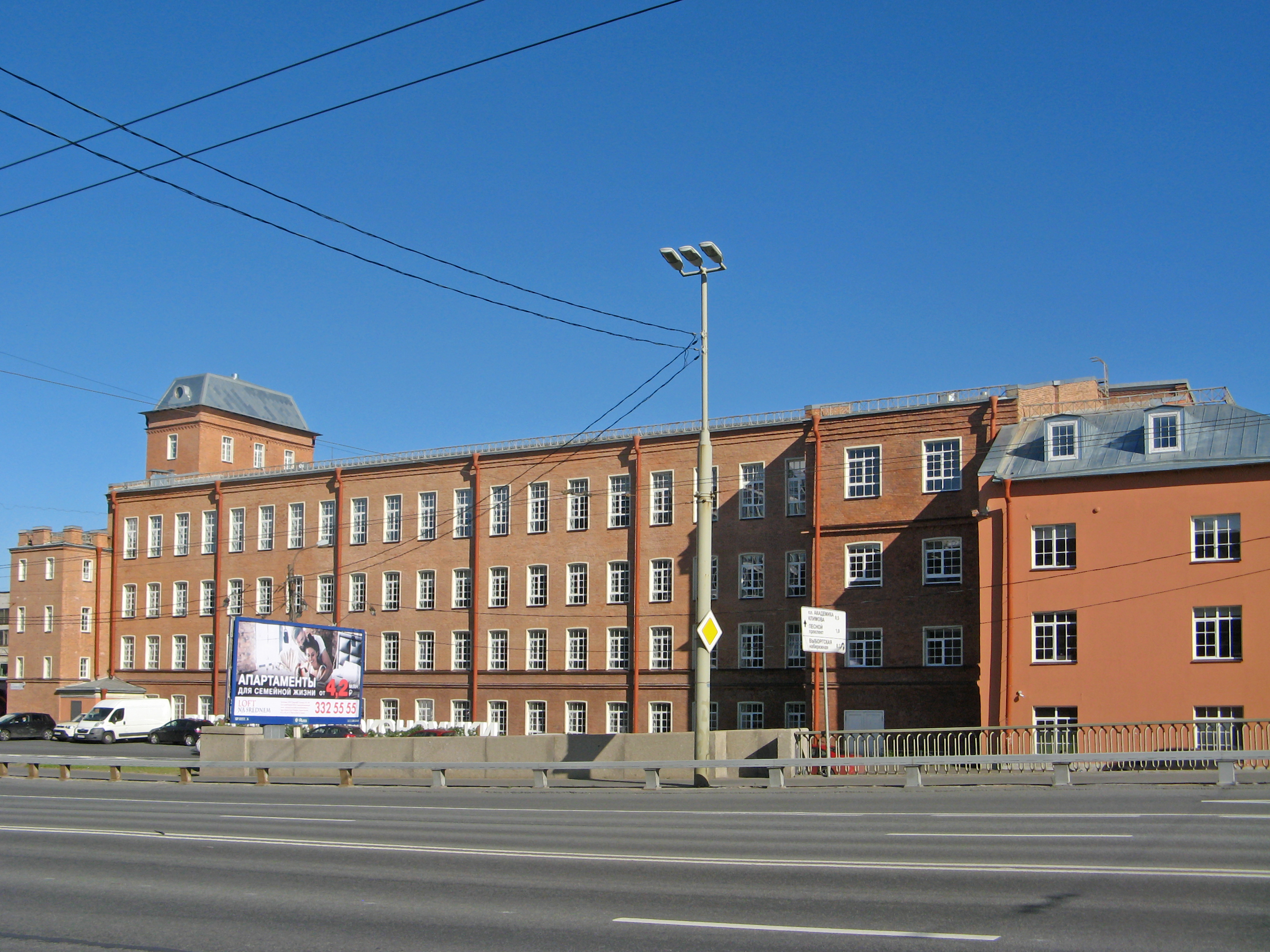
The former cotton mill, now a HSE university building

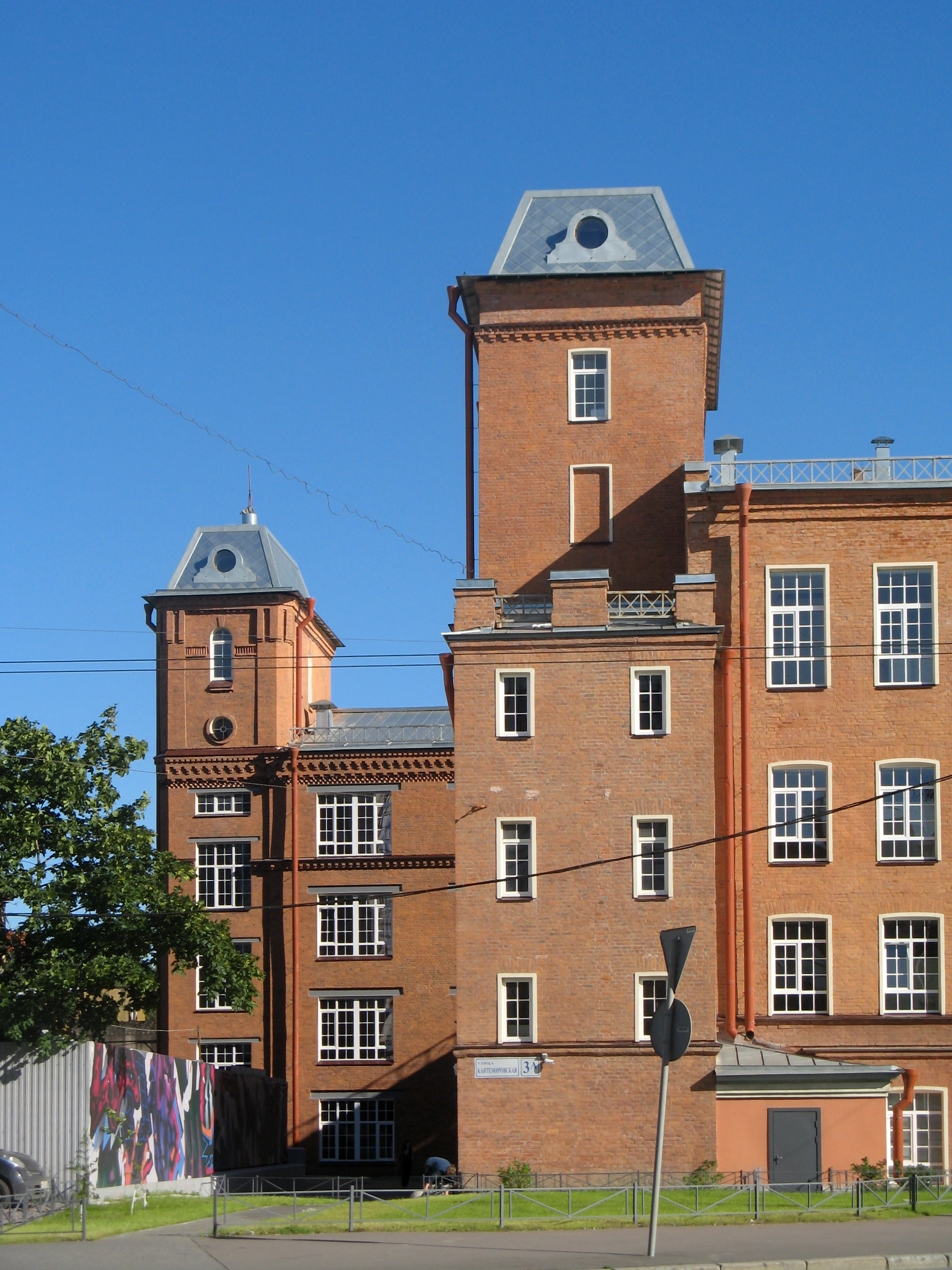

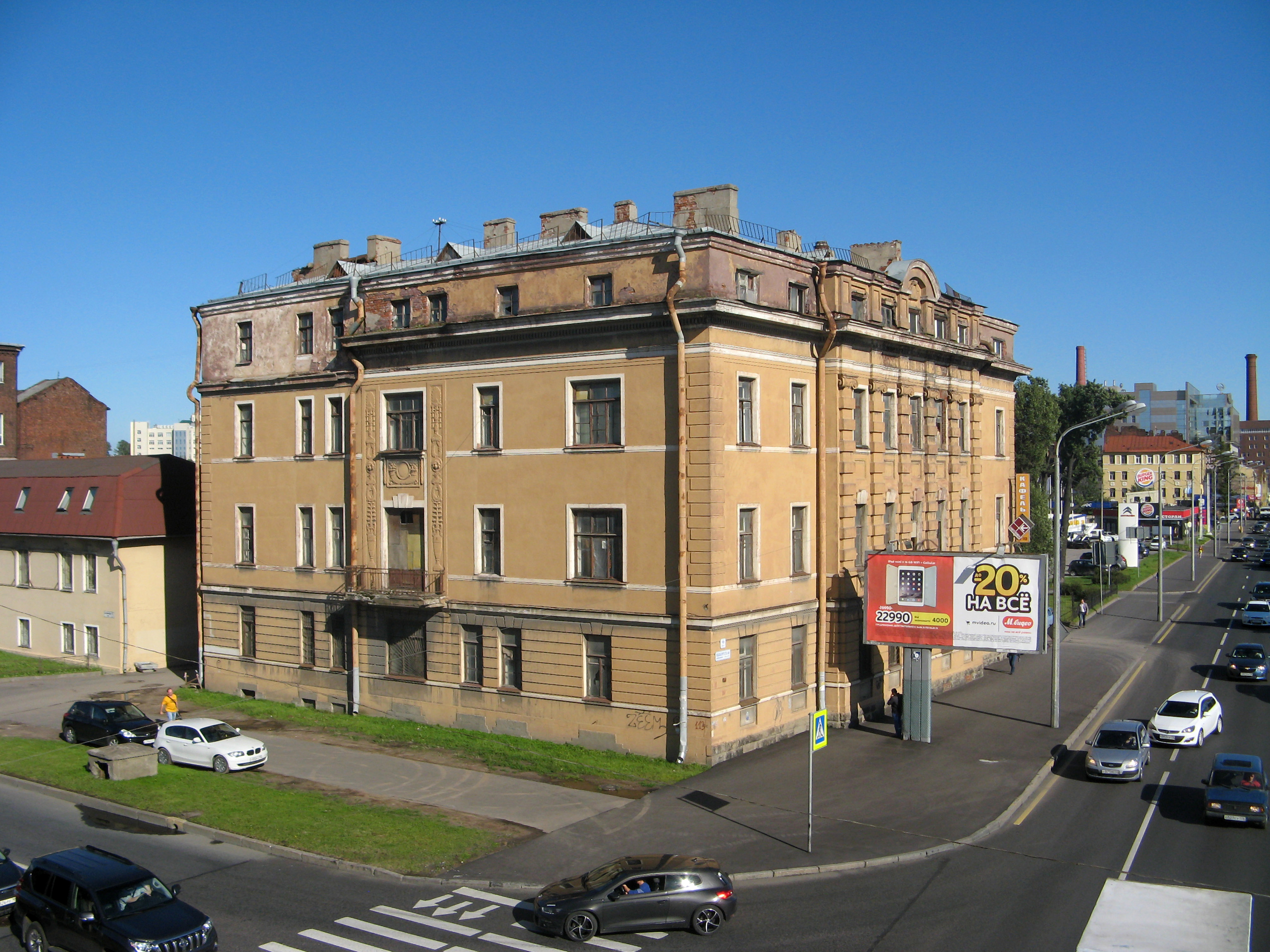
Mill workers' living house

In the vicinity of the street there also have been some buildings originally erected by 1914 for the joint stock Russian Renault automobile works. The buildings were added to over the decades after the Soviet nationalisation. Having been many times restructured under different names, this machine-building factory was eventually given the name of its head designer of its main products - aviation engines Academician Vladimir Klimov, whose name was also given to the adjoining city square with a roundabout. By 2020 the factory premises have been vacated for redevelopment, mostly for housing purposes. For retail consumers the factory produced gas lighters and was entrusted to design the torch for the 1980 Summer Olympic Games that were held in Soviet Union in Moscow, Leningrad, Tallinn etc. Two mansions built before 1917 can be seen in the street (No 17) and next to it.

Other extant structures in the street date back to 1930s (House of Specialists; dormitories for students of Polytechnic Institute), 1950s, and 1970s (factories in its western part).

As new and older factories already lemployed many people from around the city and district that had mass housing construction, in 1975 a new stretch of the city's rapid transit system's red Line One was added from the north with a station in the street. The station was named Lesnaya after the neighborhood and a nearby avenue Lesnoy Prospect that were named after the Forestry Academy the avenue leads to northwards from downtown. The academy, now a university has a large scenic park that has been a local attraction. Correspondingly, the station has green colour in its design.

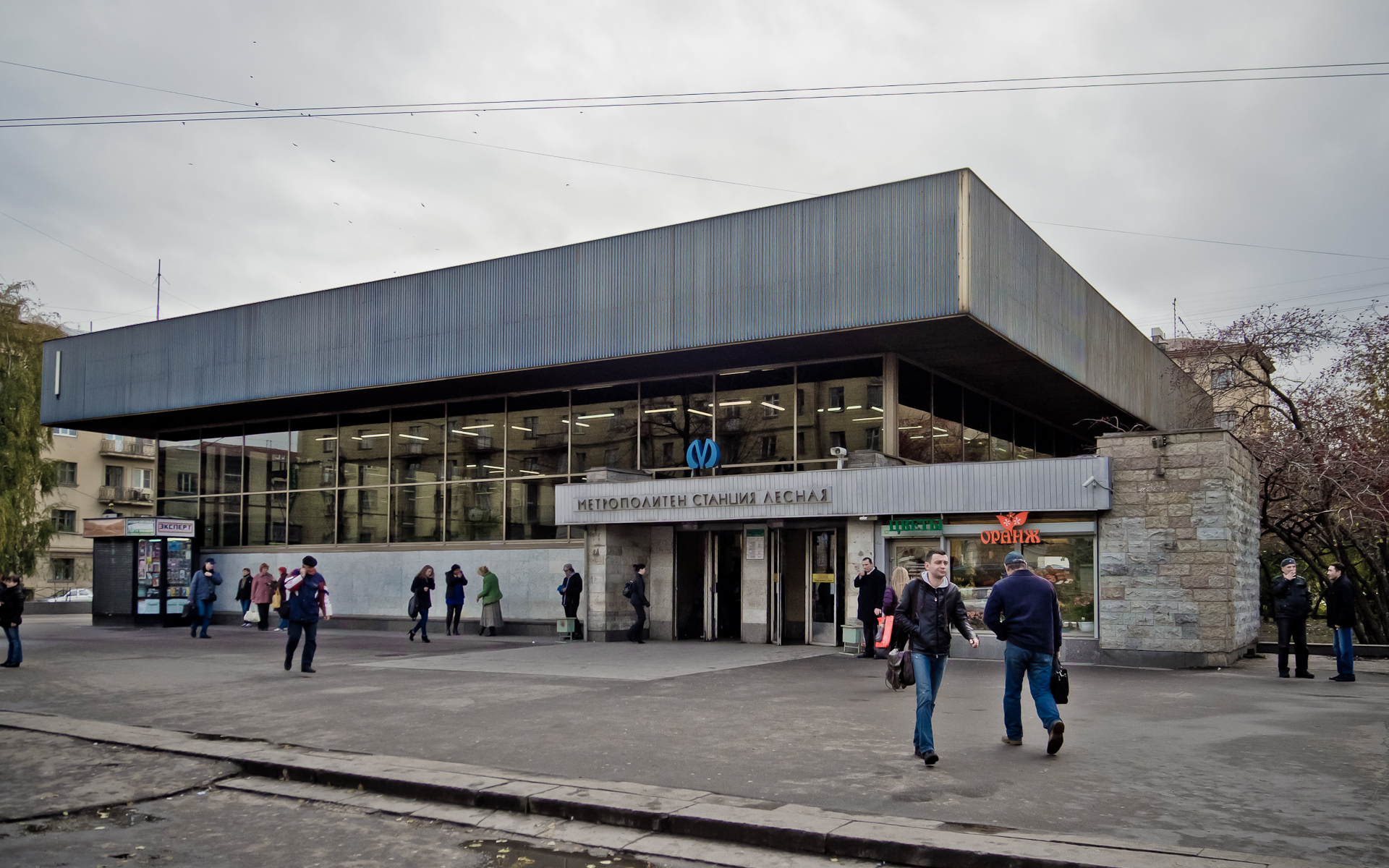
Lesnaya station building at 25 Kantemirovskaya street

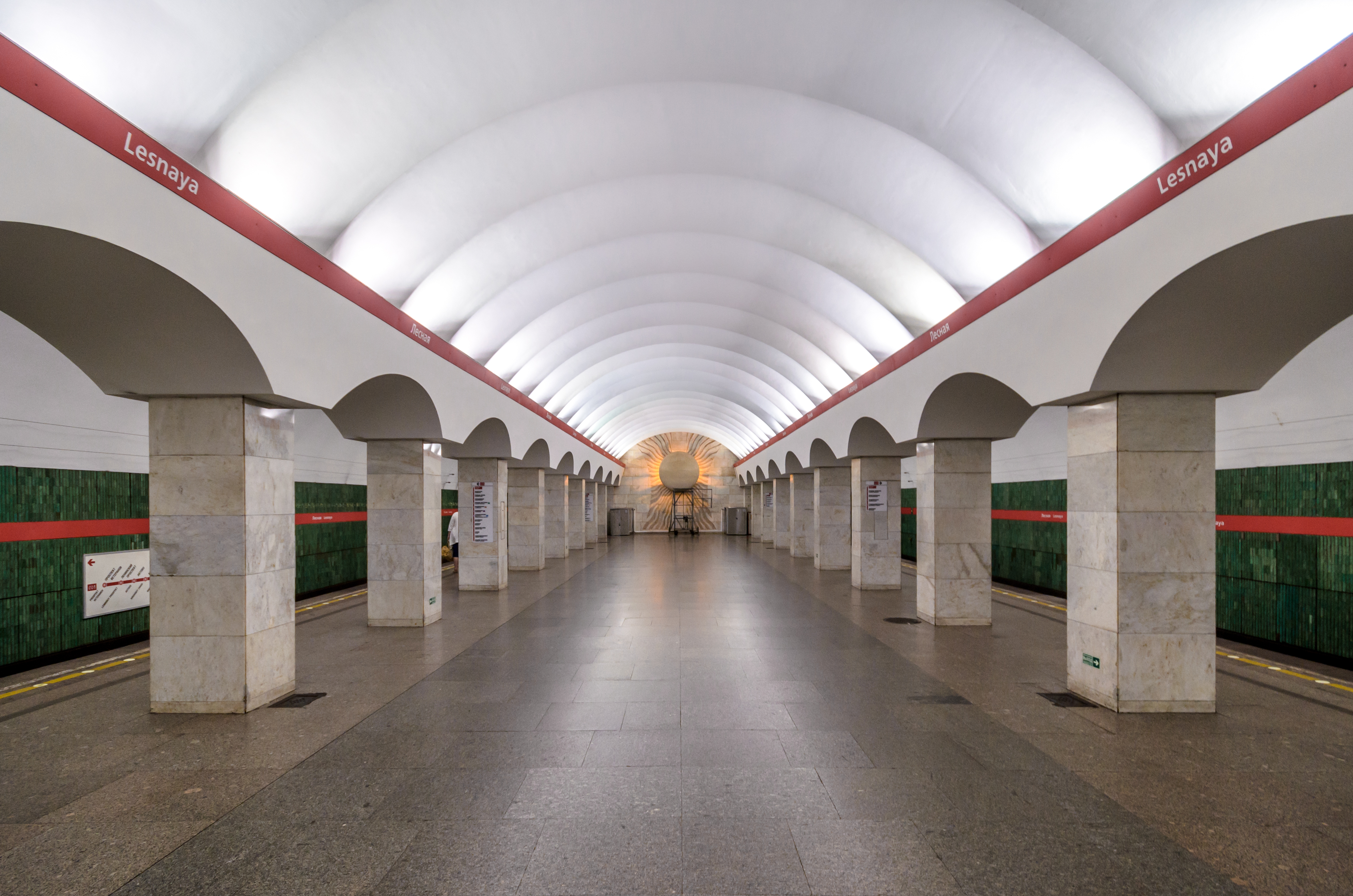
Lesnaya underground hall

== 1930-1950s construction ==
Winning the Civil War in early 1920s, Communist authorities adopted plans for national development of the economics. As manufacturing facilities were returned to work, they needed staff, and the country was to provide for their relative well-being. Since late 1920s the area around the street was given a new development, being filled with apartment houses and public facilities for workmen and professionals with families, and with technical students' dormitories.

=== The Polytechnic institute dormitory compound ===
From 1929 on the even-numbered side of the street were built two city blocks of the Lesnoy dormitory complex of the Leningrad Polytechnic Institute, with the institute's learning and original residence compound for professors located several miles away to the northeast. Dormitories' street address was 65 Lesnoy prospect, but the two blocks run along Kantemirovskaya street from the then more important Lesnoy to present-day Kharchenko street. Now the institute, founded before the Russian Revolution and named in Soviet years after Mikhail Kalinin, the nominal head of state under Stalin, is officially titled Peter the Great St. Petersburg Polytechnic University. The complex was added with a new tall building with modern amenities in early 21 century, and the university has two other residential complexes. The one in Lesnoy area was built in Constructivism style. The dormitories were supplied with such facilities as the canteen and club building that also housed an ice-cream parlour, a student theater, a small post office, a local policeman:s office. The club across the ground housed a cinema popular with the residents of the neighborhood and student leisure societies including student choir. There also were a mechanical laundry and bathhouse buildings, and across Pargolovskaya street there are a later added stadium and gym.

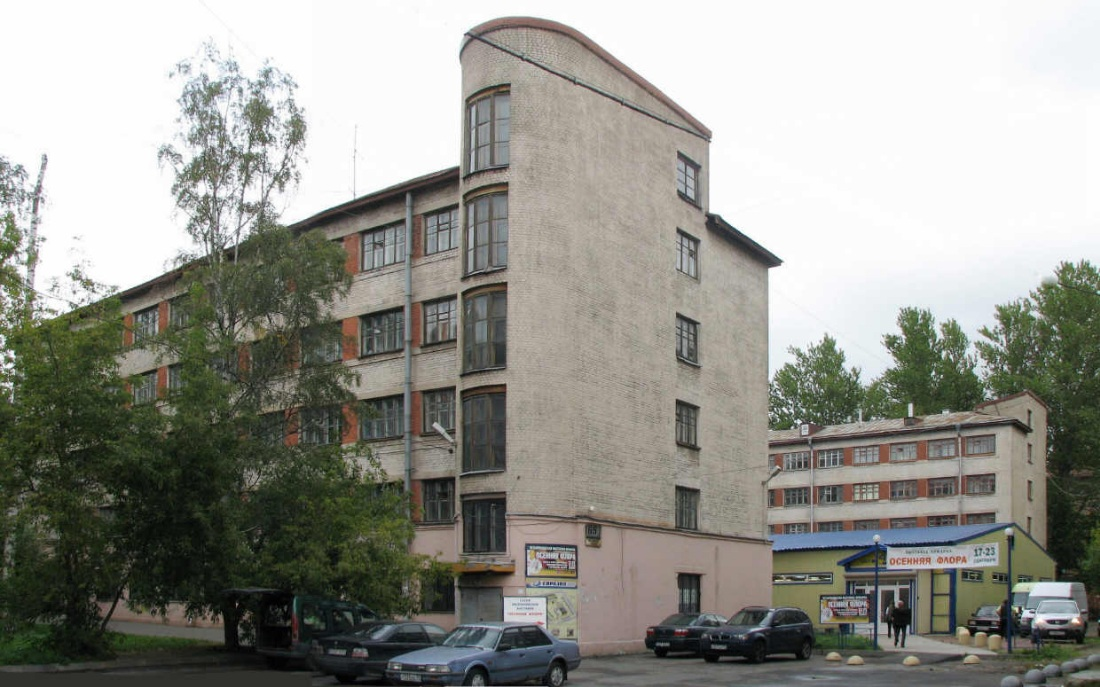
A side view of a dormitory building

The dormitory complex has been recognised as an architectural monument number 7830242000. In the 1950s the Kantemirovskaya street side of the compound was completed with two buildings, the smaller one No 26 housing a dormitory of the Pediatric Institute, and the larger one with two wings spanning the whole block from Lesnoy Prospect avenue to Pargolovskaya street, containing a polymer production design bureau in the left-hand wing, now an office building for rent, and the right-hand wing another Polytechnic institute dormitory.

External image
- 24 Kantemirovskaya

=== City block of the House of Specialists ===
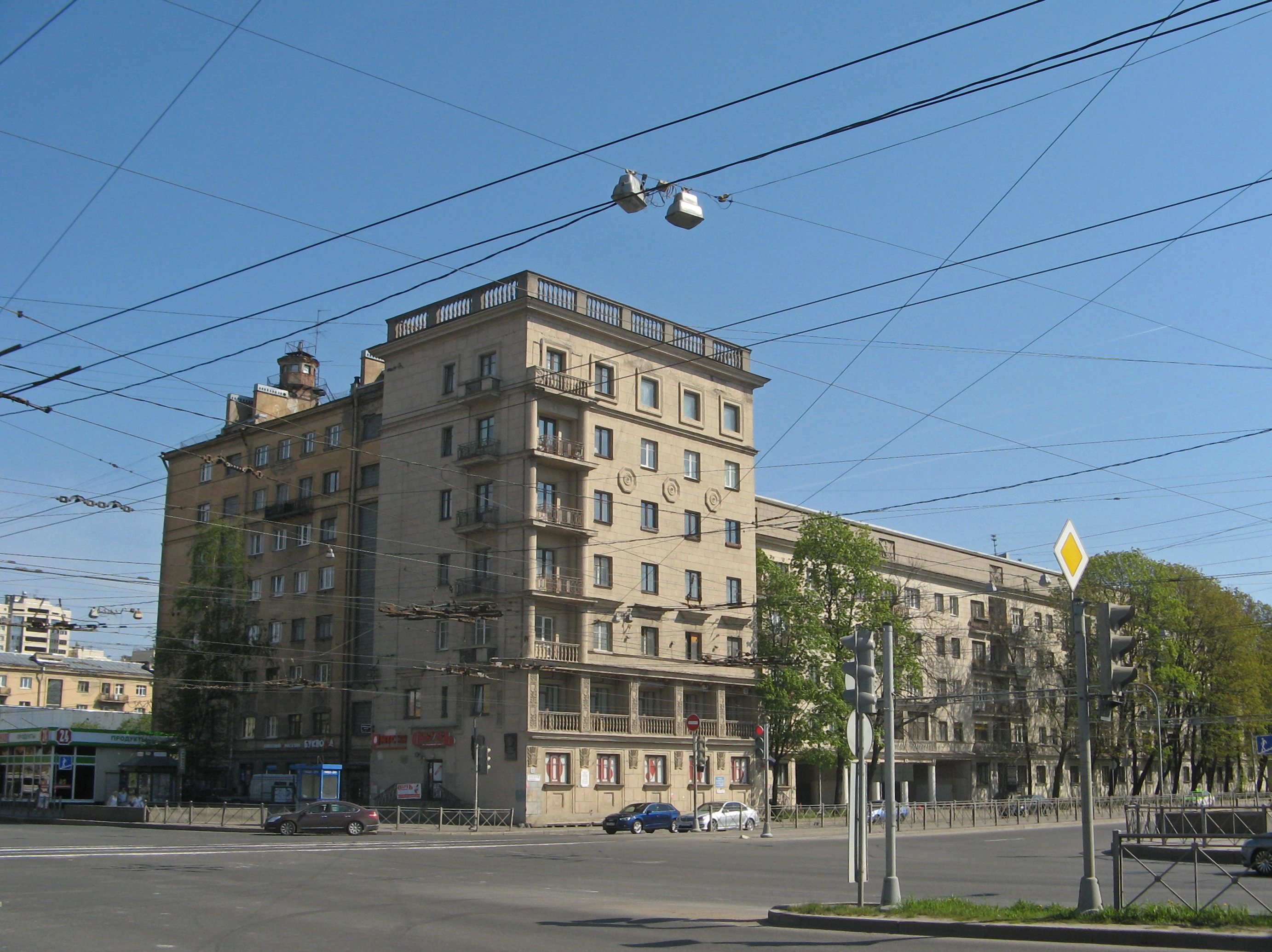
House of Specialists. Building 1 from the corner of Lesnoy Prospect avenue

In early 1930s the city block on odd-numbered side of the street immediately east of Lesnoy Prospect was filled with two sets of apartment buildings differing in the degree of built-in conveniences. In the southern part of the block the 6 residential 5-storeyed buildings of No 59 Lesnoy Prospect avenue constructed for the district textile mills workers didn't have what their nextdoor neighbors from the three houses of No. 61 Lesnoy received as members of a higher strata of professionals: flats not shared, running hot water and bathtubs with showers in them, lifts, rubbish chutes etc. These specially designed better conditions were provided for by the national government decision of 1932 to build apartment houses for specialists - several in each of a number of big cities.

No 61 by Lesnoy Prospect / 21 by Kantemirovskaya Street House of Specialists accommodated dozens of significant engineers, factory managers, scientists in various fields, and several cultural figures. As such, it was entered by an act of the city legislative assembly of 1999 on the list of local monuments of culture and history, being a Monument of Russia's cultural heritage No. 7800000004. The list of monuments includes this house as the one where lived the following notable people:

- Mikhail Aleksandrovich Bonch-Bruevich, a professor of radiophysics and engineer who developed various types of vacuum tubes and laid foundations for national radio broadcasting. Lived in the building in 1934-40, apartment No. 115 (formerly 33) of Building 2.
- Nathan Altman, a Russian and Soviet avant-garde artist, Cubist painter, stage designer and book illustrator. Lived in Building 1 in the former apartment 157 in 1937-41 and 1944-70.
- Aleksandr Kuprin, a Russian writer, in 1938 on his return from emigration until his death, Building 3, apartment 236, formerly 212.
- Vitaliy G. Khlopin, a pioneering researcher in Soviet radiochemistry who produced significant preparations of radium, was on the Soviet atomic project and whose name was given to V. G. Khlopin Radium Institute. Lived in Building 1 in 1941, 1945-50.

Memorial plaques have been mounted on the building in honour of Khlopin, Altman, Bonch-Bruevich, and in memory of the Siege of Leningrad a wall sign warning that this side of Lesnoy Prospect was the more dangerous one during the enemy artillery fire. In the 2nd half of 2010s less noticeable smaller memorial plaques were also mounted on the building to commemorate its residents who fell victim of Stalin's time purges. Their names were established by the city's civil activity organisation Memorial dedicated to rehabilitation and commemoration of innocent people who were oppressed from the 1930s to 1950s and Vozvraschionniye imena (Returned names) history research center set up to find names, compile biographies and keep the memory of Russia's victims of XX century's wars and purges working at the National Library of Russia in Saint Petersburg.

=== Five-storey apartment buildings ===
On the odd-numbered side of the street a city block of five-storey yellow apartment buildings of the 1-506 series housing project was constructed. They were designed in the times of Khrushchev known for houses with small flats, low ceilings, merged bathroom and toilet, but this earlier type was different for the better. The block from late 1950s for workers of construction trust number 104 is between Pargolovskaya and Kharchenko streets.

=== School 104 ===
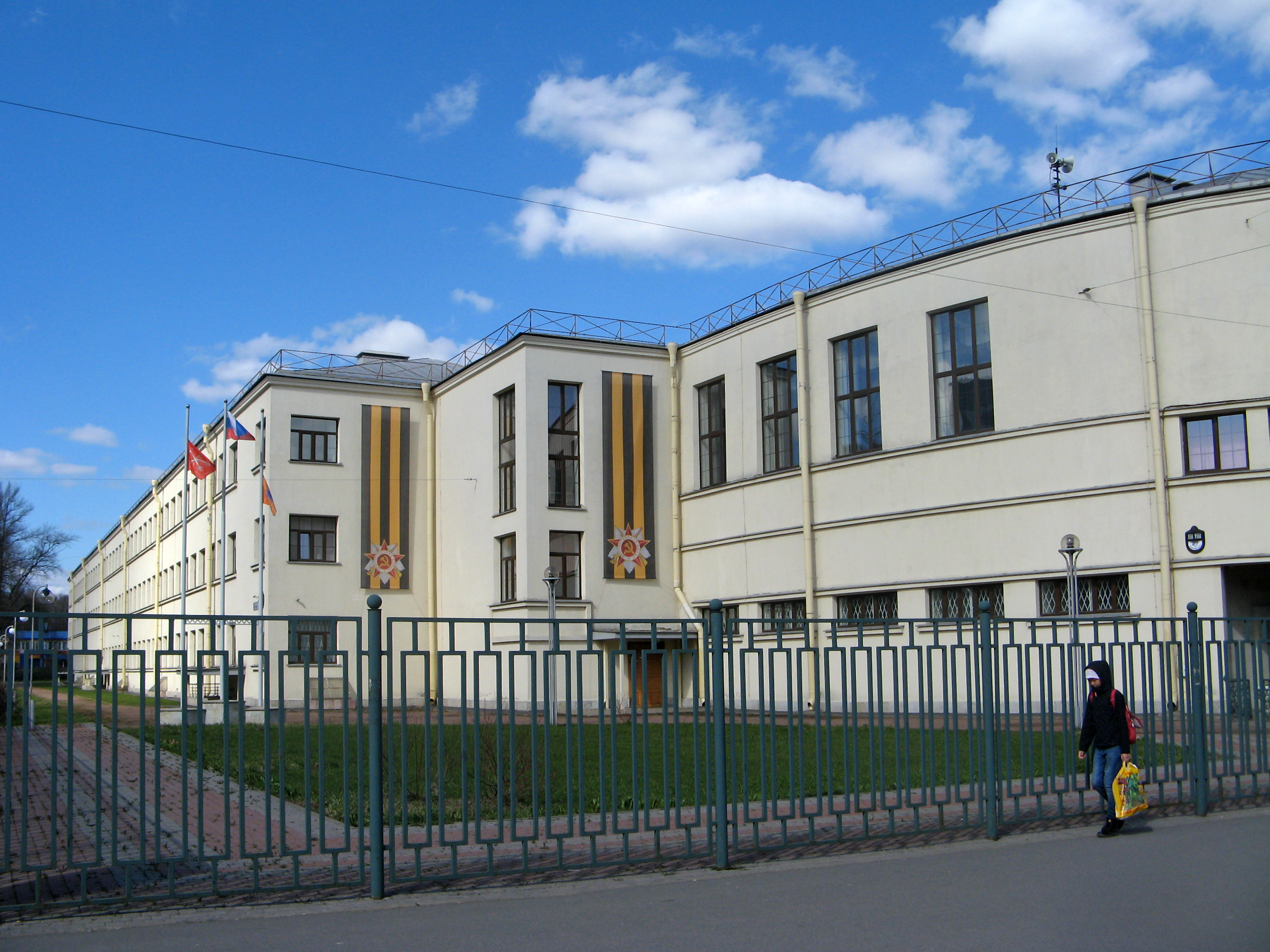

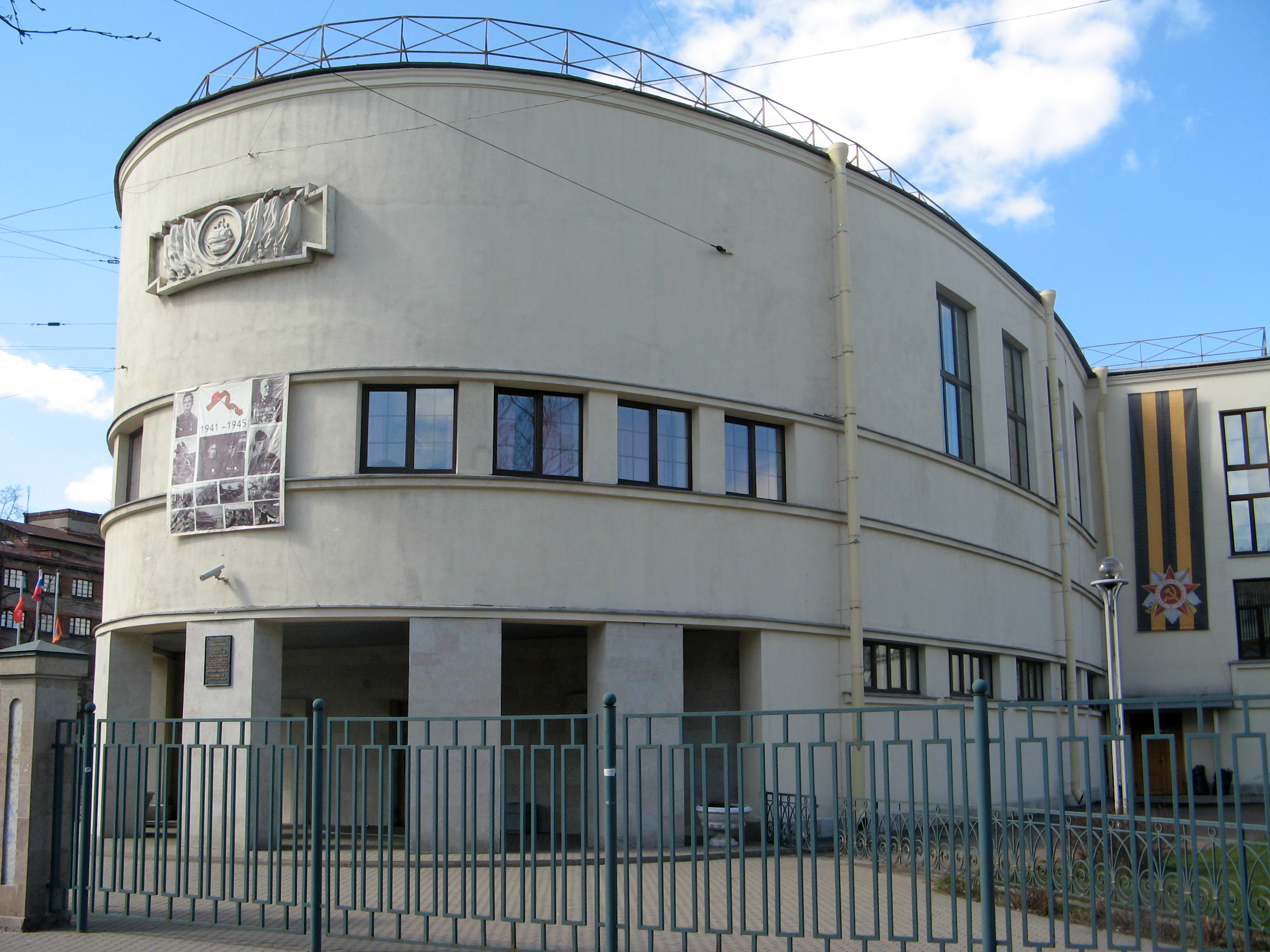

In 1930s a long three-storey school building was erected at the eastern end of the street on the corner of Antonovskiy Lane, now Kharchenko Street. It was built to an individual project by Vladimir Munz in Constructivist style for a young cadets school. It features a large auditorium in its from semicircular part, two gyms at the back, and during the 2000s refurbishment its sports grounds were turned into a soccer and track and field stadium. After World War II school staff and students met veterans of Soviet guerilla units operating during the war in the then-larger city's region Leningrad Oblast, now in Pskov Oblast. Its rural area cut off from the besieged Leningrad by enemy German lines was controlled by the Soviet guerrilla troops and managed to collect and deliver to the starving city a food supply train of horse-drawn sleighs in the harsh winter of 1941-42. The school has its museum of these events and regional 2nd guerilla brigade. The school and the street were awarded the name of Mikhail Kharchenko, the Soviet officer in charge of the delivery operation guard. It was a girls' school until the mid-1950s. It gives full elementary and secondary education.

== 1960s-1970s industrial construction ==
In late 1960s and in 1970s a complex of electrotechnical research and development and production facilities was built in the western part of the street. They made communications equipment. In post-Soviet times some premises were renovated and became available for office rent.

== 1980s road network redevelopment ==
In 1970s it was planned to connect several streets across the city into a chain thoroughfare to improve passenger and cargo transportation. Kantemirovskaya street was a part of this plan and as such had its road widened twofold, connected to its east with Marshal Blukher Avenue overland, while the western end of the street reaching Vyborgskaya Embankment of the Bolshaya Nevka arm of the Neva delta was joined by a new bridge to Apothecary Island of the more central Petrograd Side, giving access over it to Vasilyevsky Island and the left bank of the Neva with the central district of the city. The bridge was named Kantemirovskiy after the street. It was built in 1979-82.

Previously, there was no bridge link here. The need to build a new bridge arose because of the construction of an internal transport highway in the city, which starts from Tsiolkovsky Street, runs along the northern side of the Obvodny Canal with access to Alexander Nevsky Bridge and then along Zanevsky Prospect to the bridge across the Okhta River in the alignment of Energetikov Avenue, then along Annikov Avenue to Kantemirovskaya Street, in the alignment of which Kantemirovsky Bridge is located, and then across Aptekarsky Island to the Petrograd Side to the area of Kamennoostrovsky Bridge. - Kantemirovsky bridge, Committee for the development of transport infrastructure of St. Petersburg City Government

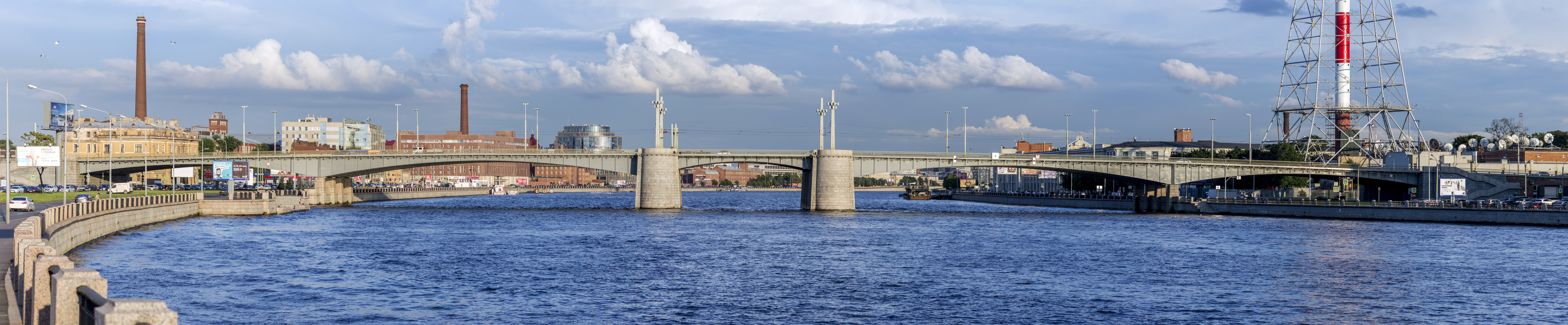
Kantemirovsky Bridge Panorama

The bridge connected the Vyborg Side to Petrograd Side, and the new version of trolleybus Route 46 originally went over them to the Harbour at the western end of Vasilyevski Island, reaching eastwards the roundabout nearest to the bridge on the Vyborg Side - now Academician Klimov Square, while later the route was replaced with number 31 that serves now, without covering Vasilyevski, a shorter western part as far as Sportivenaya metro station, but passed the whole length of Kantemirovskaya Street and turns northward to cover the southern part of Grazhdanskiy Prospect avenue to take to work downtown and back home people along its large Grazhdanka residential neighborhood. In post-Soviet years the streets took on themselves a considerably increased load of new private automobiles and several routes of buses.

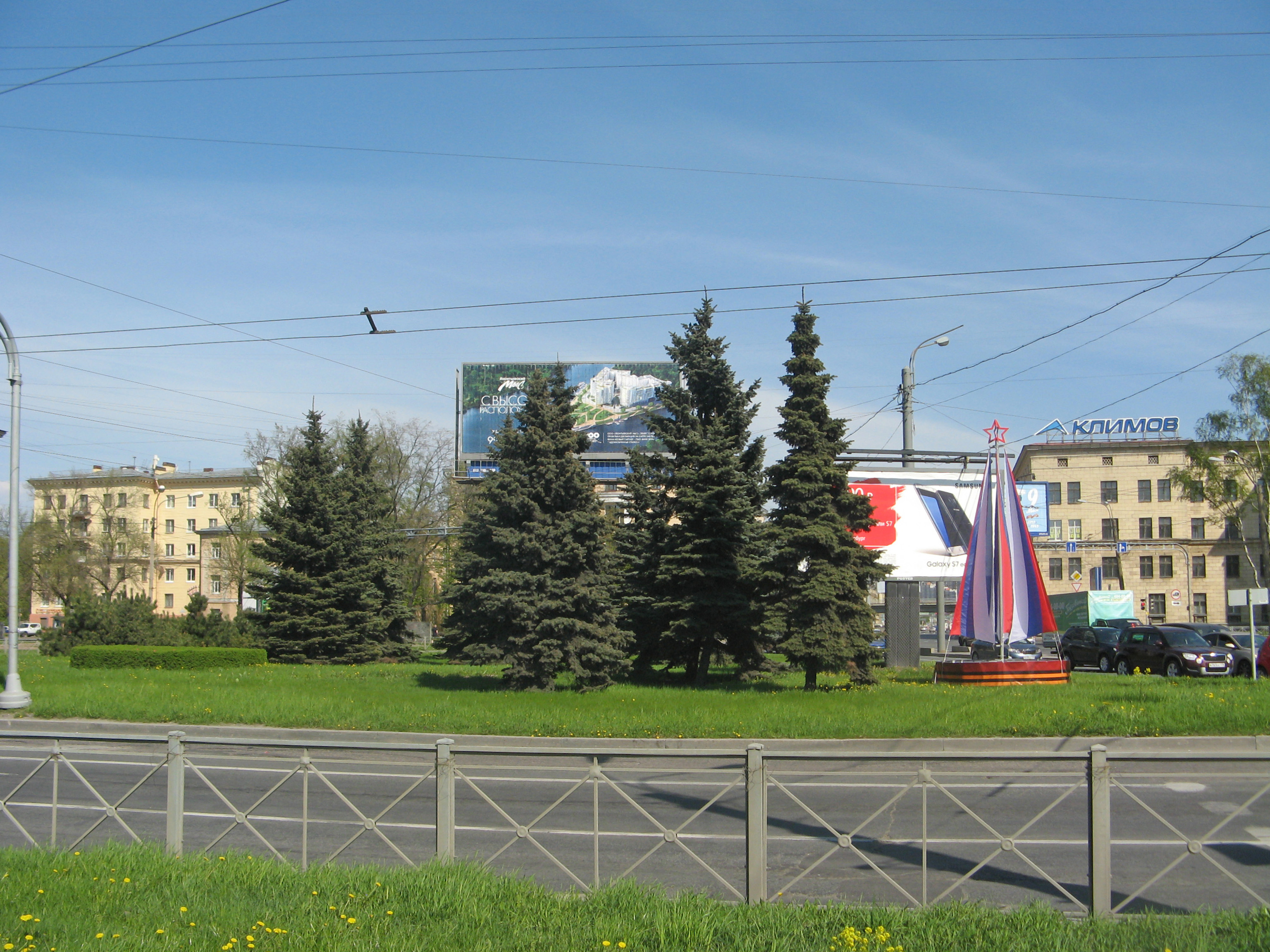
Academician Klimov Square with trolleybus wires overhead

Road widening required twofold elongation of the railroad bridge across it, and underground crossings were built on the crossroads nearest to the metro station.

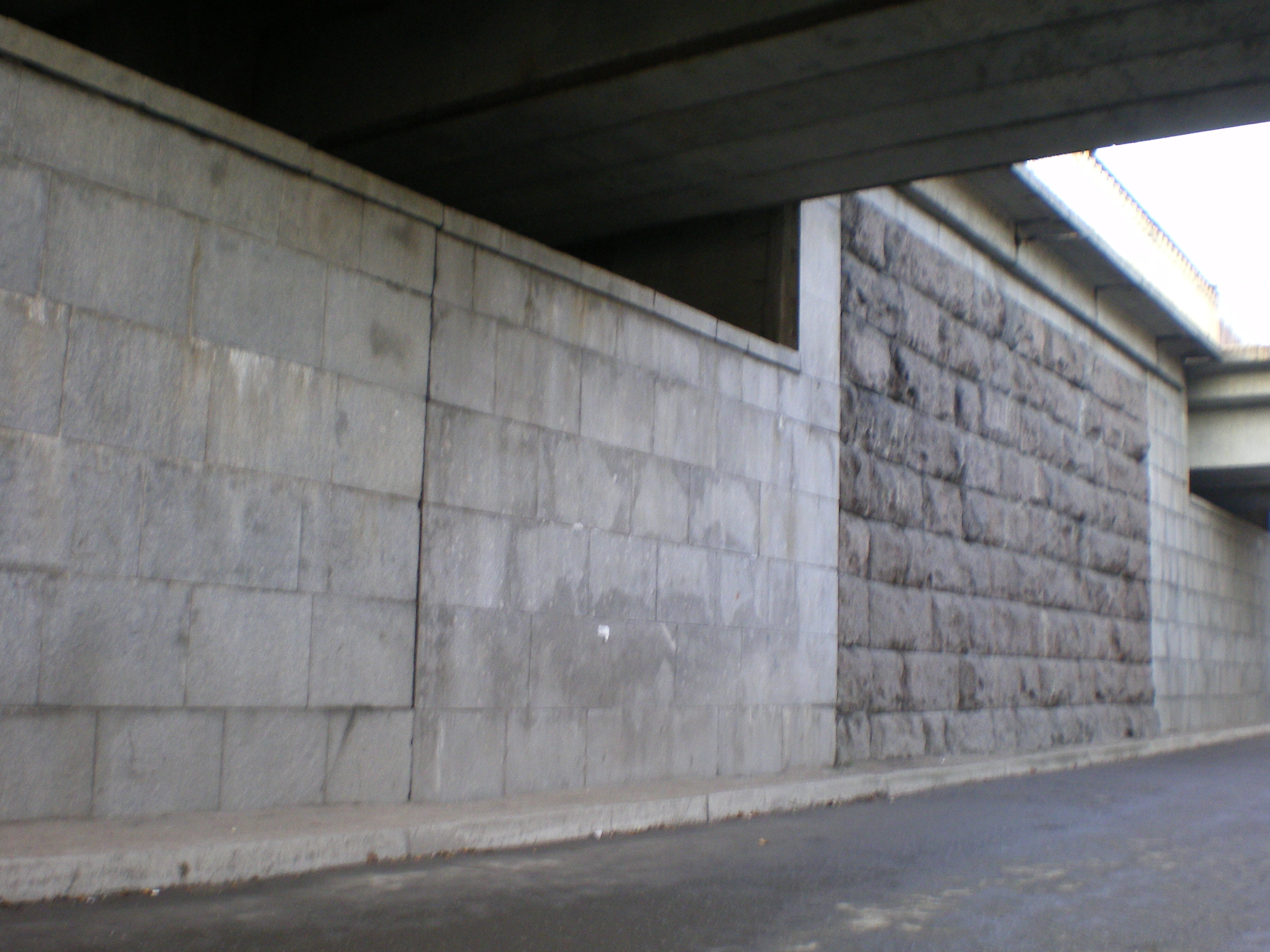

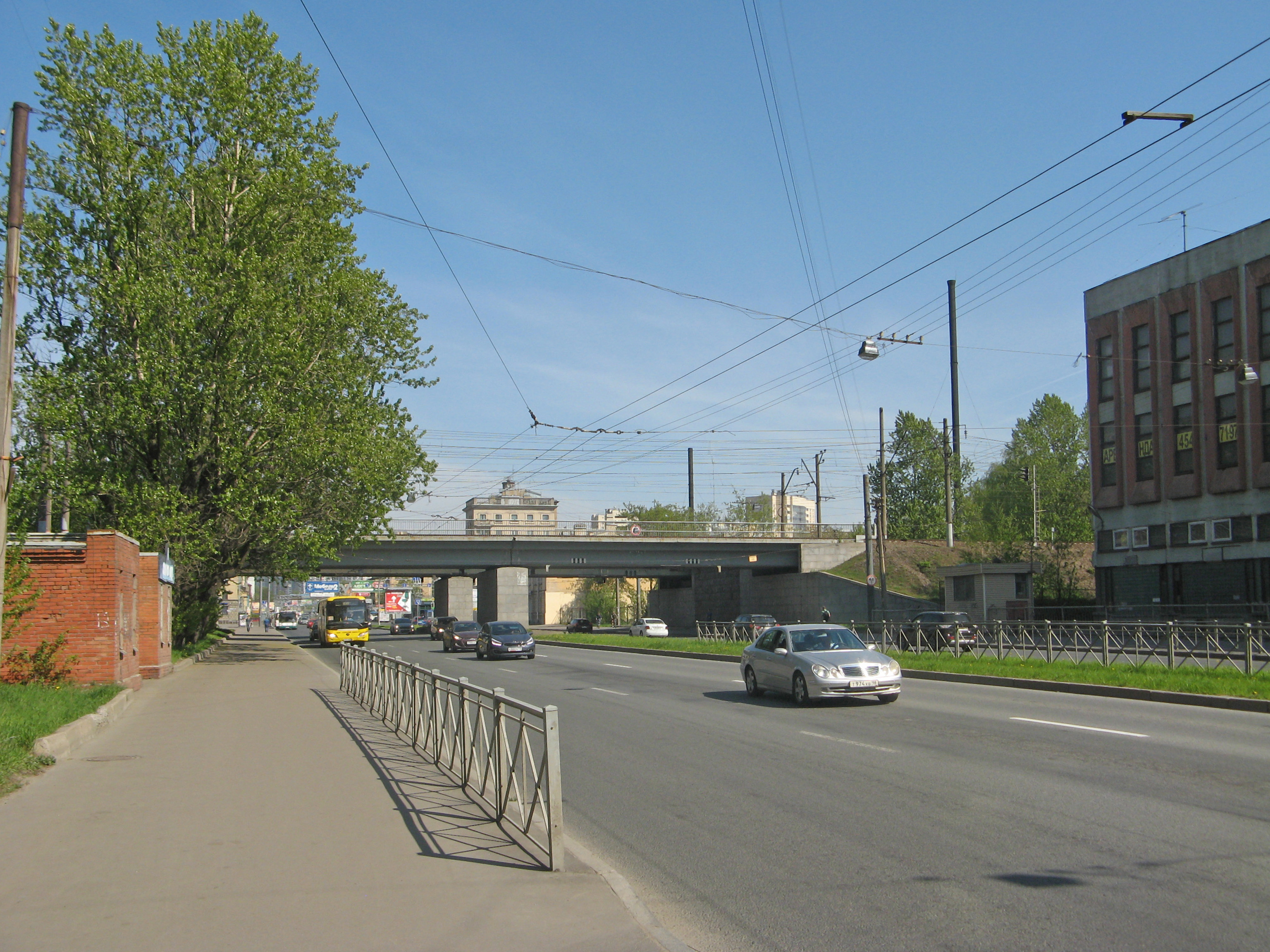

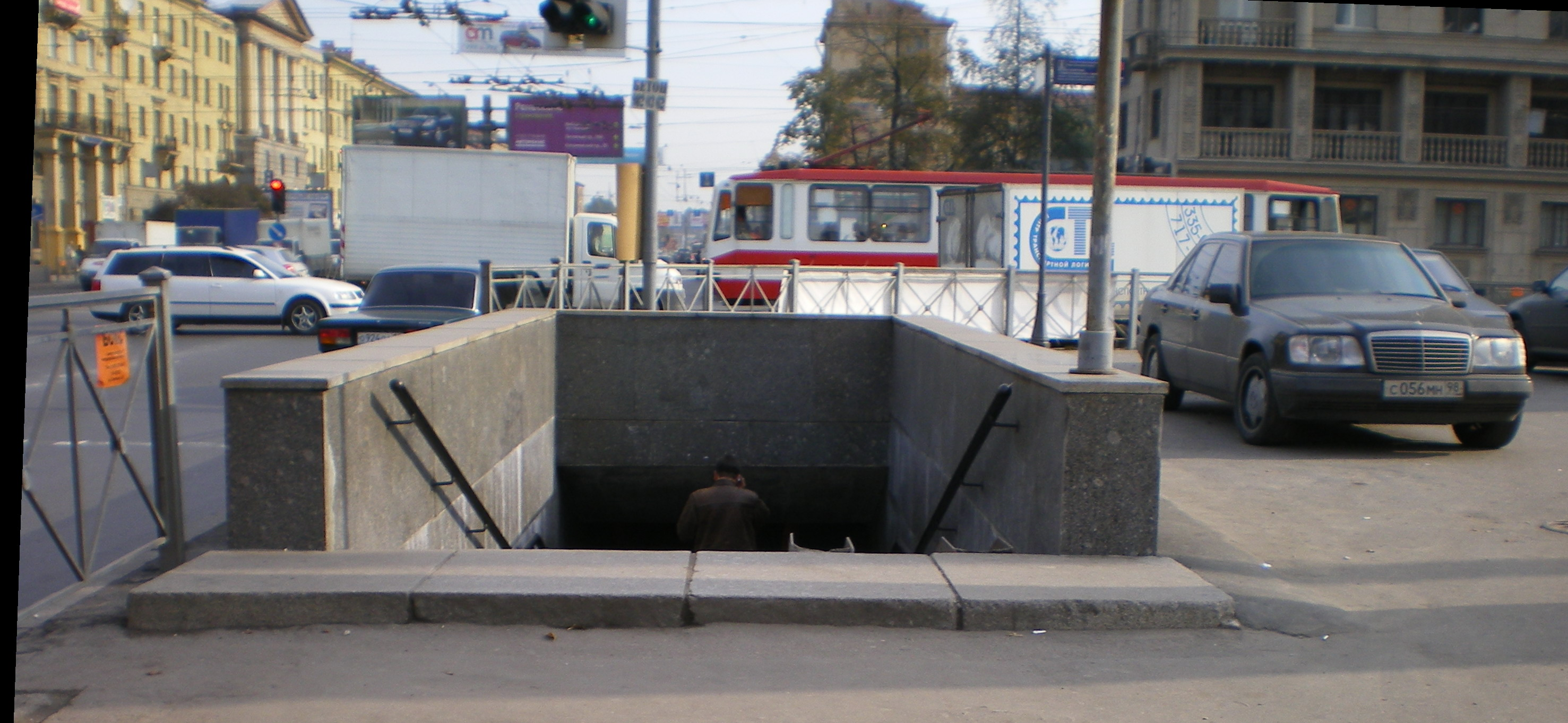

== 21st century ==
In 1990s many state-owned factories were made joint-stock companies, some underwent job cuts and/or relocation. Several buildings in the western and central parts of the street were converted into rented office spaces. To the east of the street two large city blocks of modern tall apartment buildings started to be built, changing its panorama. School 104 underwent reconstruction and was supplied with modern technology. To the east of it a large shopping mall Europolis was built on a part of the green area, the rest of which had been made into a public Polyustrovskiy Garden. On the other side of the street on the corner of Gribalyova Street appeared one of the latter street's two large furniture sales multibrand centers, Mebel City 2, behind which in the second decade of 21 century appeared a city block of new apartment buildings reaching as far as Novolitovskaya Street.
