= Tamara Katsenelenbogen =

Latvian architect

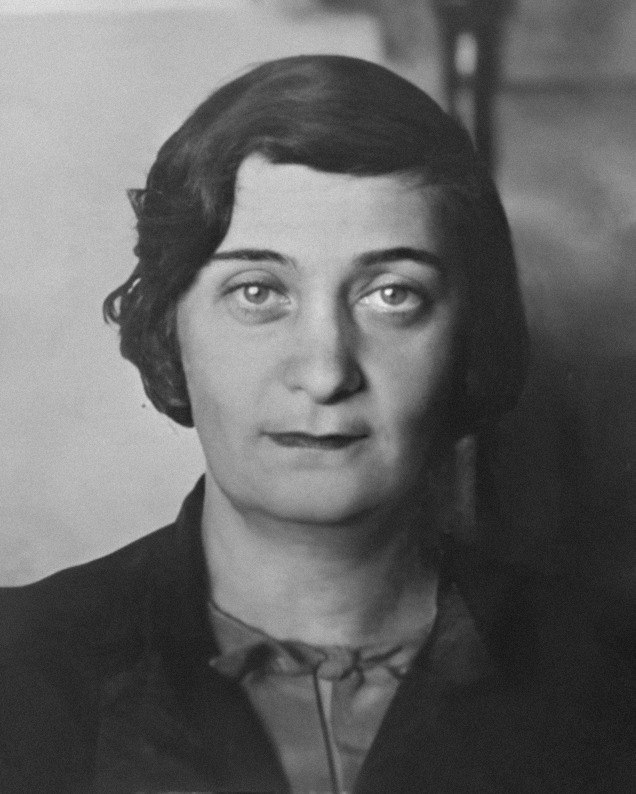
- Born: 1894; Dvinsk, Russian Empire
- Died: 1976; Leningrad, Soviet Union
- Occupation: Architect

Tamara Davydovna Katsenelenbogen (Russian: Тамара Давыдовна Каценеленбоген; 1894−1976) was a Soviet constructivist architect and urban planner.

== Biography ==
Tamara Davydovna Katsenelenbogen was born in Dvinsk, Vitebsk Governorate, Russian Empire (now Daugavpils, Latvia). Her brother, Nikolay Katzenellenbogen, was also a famous Jewish architect of the late 19th century. In 1911, Tamara Davydovna entered, and in 1916 graduated from the department of architecture of the Women's Polytechnic Institute - the first higher technical educational institution for women in the Russian Empire.

In 1923 she graduated from the Architecture Faculty of the St. Petersburg Academy of Arts. She designed and built a number of buildings in Leningrad and other cities of the Soviet Union.

== Selected projects ==
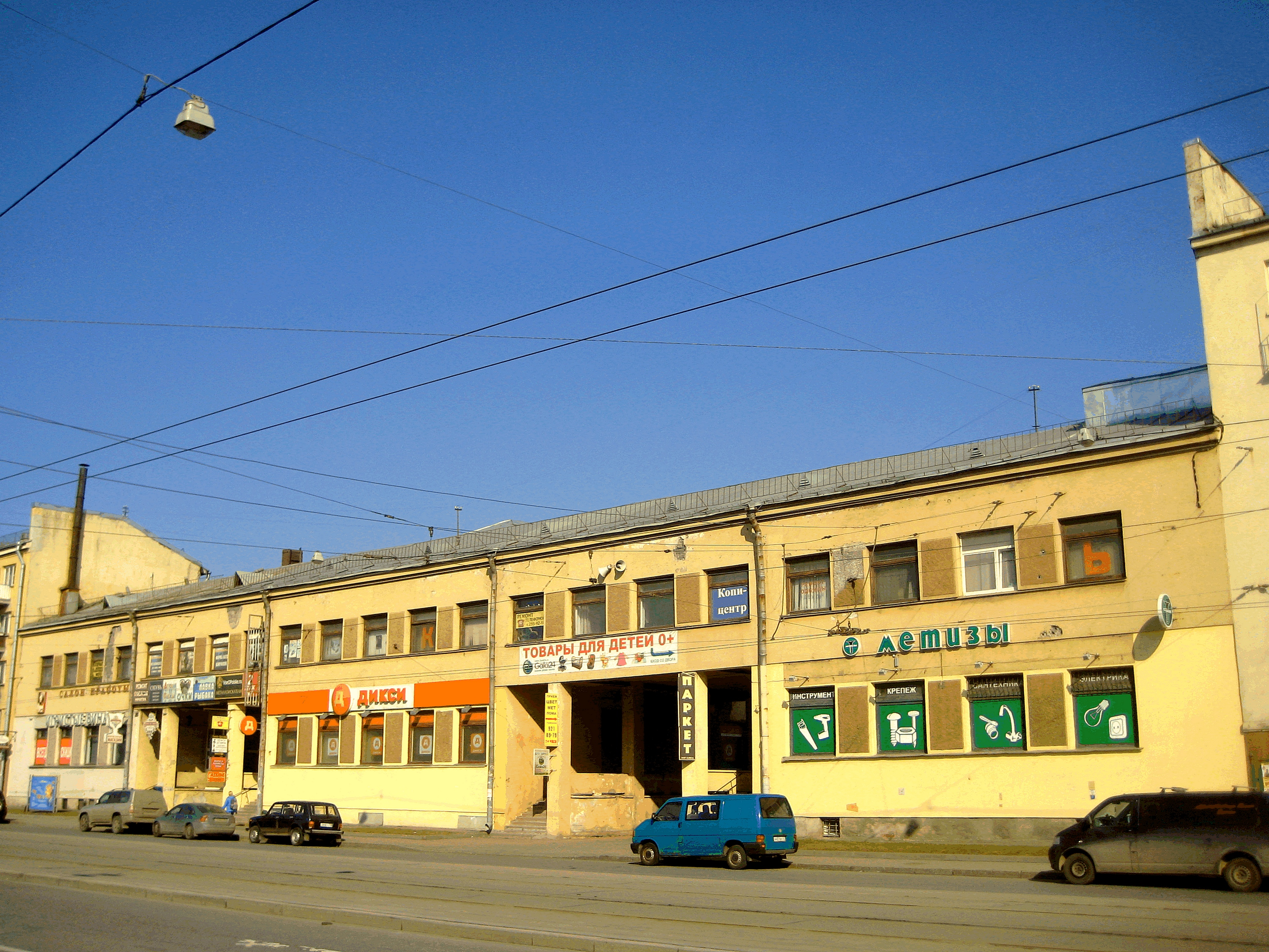
Bateninsky residential development, Woodland Avenue, St. Petersburg

- Competition design of the Palace of Labor (1923).
- Project development area TEZHE in the city of Kaluga (1930)
- Project planning and development of the center of the city of Murmansk (1930)
- Sanatorium " New Sochi " (1955)
- Residential buildings on the street Smolyachkova, 14–16, St. Petersburg (with G.A. Simonov and V.A. Zhukovsky)
- Baburin residential development, Lesnaya Avenue, St. Petersburg (with G.A. Simonov and V.A. Zhukovsky, 1927–1930)
- Bateninsky residential development, Woodland Avenue, St. Petersburg (with G.A. Simonov, B. R. Rubanenko, P. Stepanov and V.A. Zhukovsky, 1927–1934)
- Vyborg department store as part Batenenskogo residential development

== Literature ==
- Berkovich, Gary. Reclaiming a History. Jewish Architects in Imperial Russia and the USSR. Volume 2. Soviet Avant-garde: 1917–1933. Weimar und Rostock: Grunberg Verlag. 2021. P. 58. ISBN 978-3-933713-63-6
- Fernandez Garcia, Ana; Seražin, Helena; Garda, Emilia Maria; Franchini, Caterina, eds. (2016). MoMoWo. 100 projects in 100 years. European Women in Architecture and Design. 1918-2018. Ljubljana: Založba ZRC. ISBN 978-961-05-0377-4.
- Isachenko, Valery (2000). Зодчие Санкт–Петербурга. ХХ век [Architects of St.Petersburg. 20th Century] (in Russian). Cham: Лениздат. p. 661. ISBN 5-289-01928-6.
