= Vyborgsky District, Saint Petersburg =

Vyborgsky District, Saint Petersburg Выборгский район (Russian)
- District
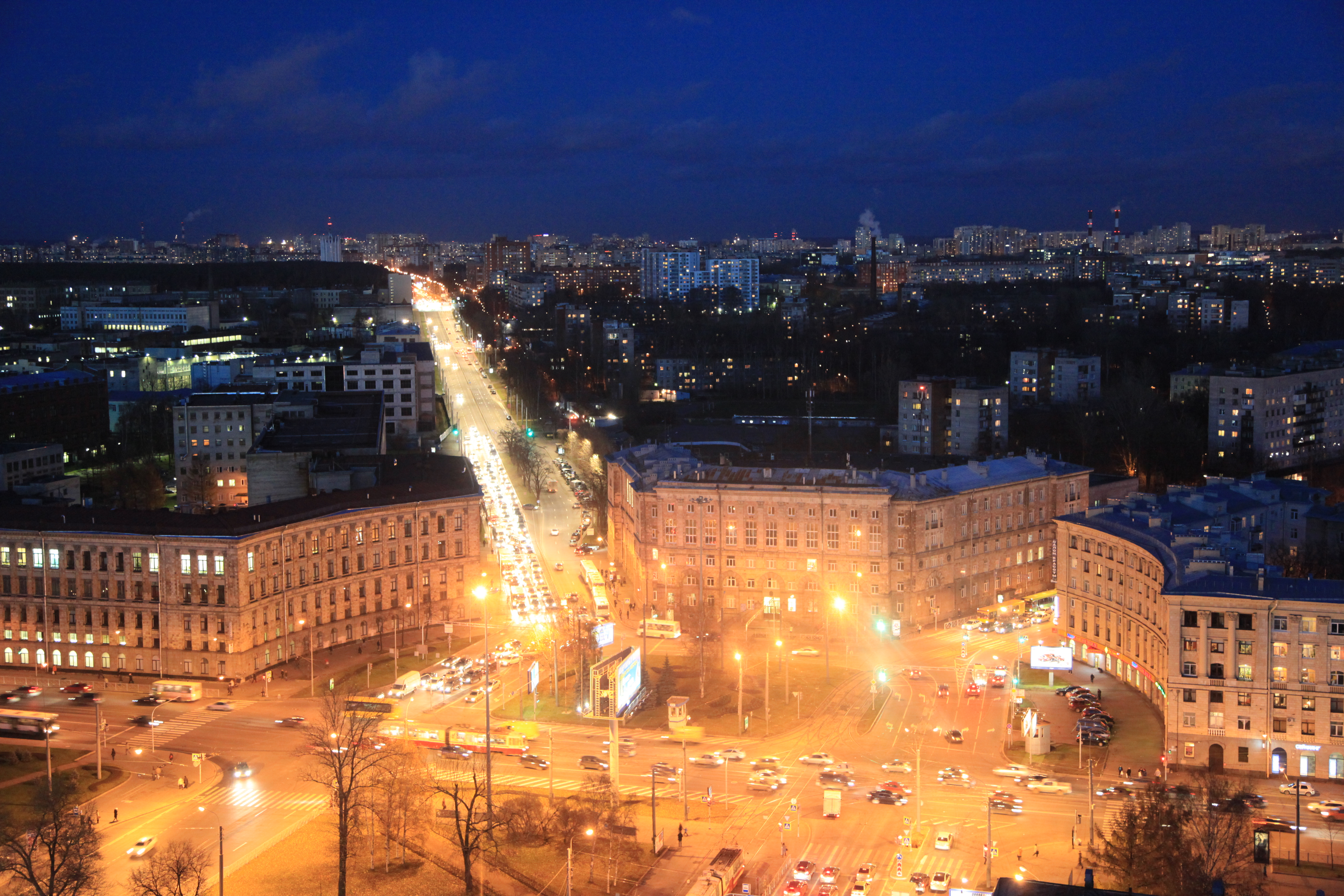
- Svetlanovskaya square at night
- Location of Vyborgsky District, Saint Petersburg on the map of Saint Petersburg
- Coordinates: 60°06′N 30°18′E
- Country: Russia
- Federal subject: Saint Petersburg
- Established: 1917

Area
  - Total: 35.4 km^{2} (13.7 sq mi)

Population
  - Estimate (01.01.2013): 453,759
- Website: http://gov.spb.ru/gov/terr/reg_viborg/

Vyborgsky District (Russian: Вы́боргский райо́н, romanized: Výborgskiy raión, IPA: [ˈvɨbərkskʲɪj rɐˈjɵn]) is an administrative and municipal district (raion), one of the 18 in Saint Petersburg, Russia.

== History and present ==
=== Overview and early decades ===
This historical north-western area of St. Petersburg was named after the castle town of Vyborg (Rus. Выборг - a transcription of its Swedish name Viborg) after the latter was taken from Swedish Empire (which then included present-day Finland) by the Imperial Russian Army under the command Tsar Peter the Great during the Great Northern War of early 18th century, thus safeguarding the new Russian capital St. Petersburg. This north-western area of the city was the nearest to Vyborg and has been connected to it by major roads which have almost never lost their significance as international transportation routes.

This part of the city, divided in the 20th century longitudinally between Vyborgski and Kalininskiy districts of the city, has been historically known as Vyborgskaya storona - the Vyborg Side (the northern side - bank - of the Neva River delta).

The south of the district has so far kept most of its traditional brick buildings of both factories, offices and apartment houses dating back to the 19 century through the 1950s, while its northern half has been built up as a residential area by 9-12-storey-high apartment blocks since the 1960s, with present-day construction companies encroaching with their apartment 15-20+-storey-tall high-rises on both the older and the newer parts of the district.

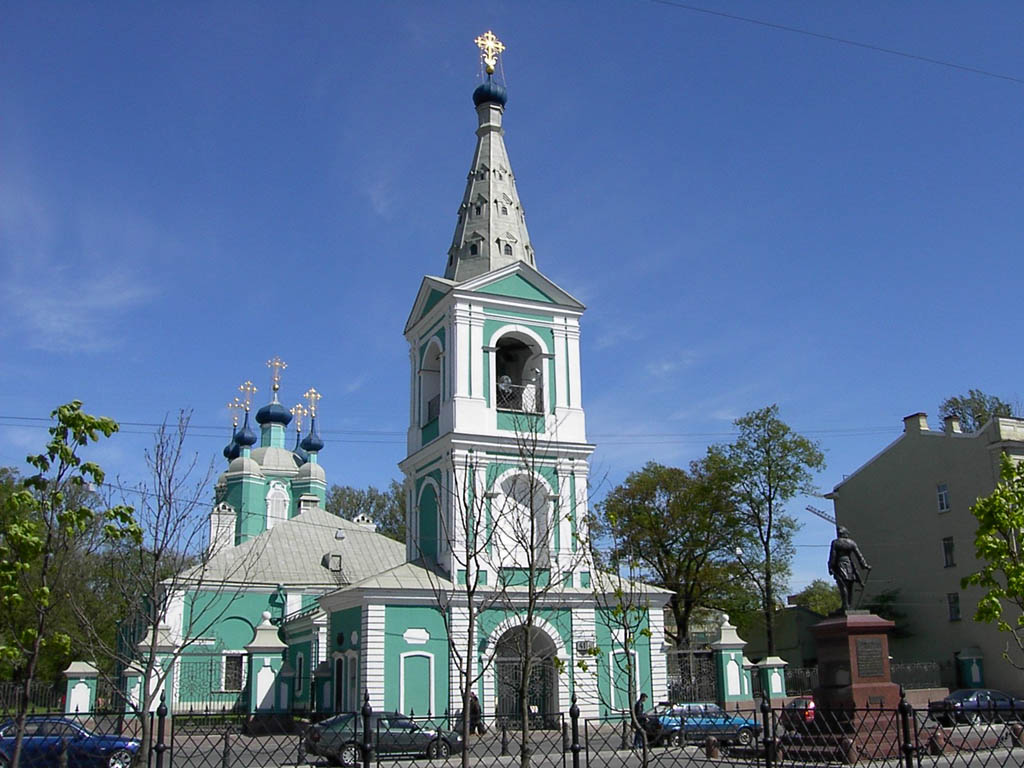
Saint Sampson's Cathedral

Vyborgski district has preserved a certain tangible memory of the nation's success in the Great Northern War. The day of the decisive Battle of Poltava in the south (in what is now Ukraine), on which Russians had their first major success in the war, fell on the feast day of Saint Sampson the Hospitable (June 27, 1709), and a grand cathedral in his honour was built on the road to Vyborg. Completed during the reign of Anna of Russia, Sampsoniyevskiy Sobor (Saint Sampson's Cathedral) is now a museum - a branch of the ring of four museum churches with the head office at Saint Isaac's Cathedral. Saint Sampson's Cathedral features among the few church buildings preserved from the first half of the 18th century - from the city's first decades of existence. It replaced an earlier wooden church, whose construction started in 1709 on the Tsar's order, and which was consecrated the following year. The cathedral is interesting architecturally for its admixture of Old Russian forms with then-current elements of Western European trends, forming together "Anna's baroque" and is also known for its unique carved wooden iconostasis from that time. For the bicentennial of the Battle of Poltava the ground floor of the bell tower was decorated by memorial plaques citing Peter's selfless encouraging words to his army on the day. Opposite the building was placed Peter the Great's statue by Mark Antokolsky, taken away under Soviet rule years and restored on its place in the early 21st century.

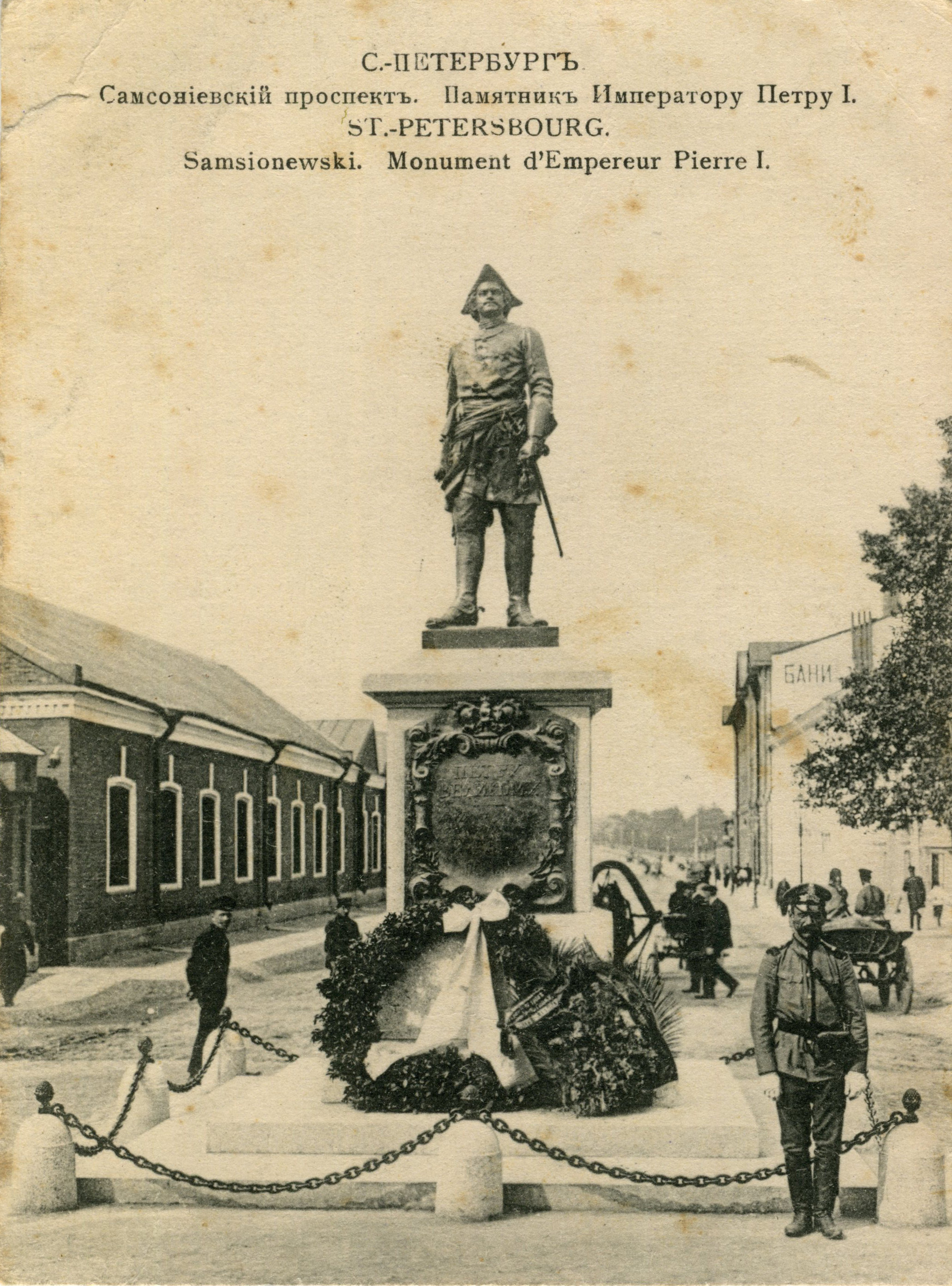
Monument to Peter the Great opposite Saint Sampson's Cathedral. Early 20th century

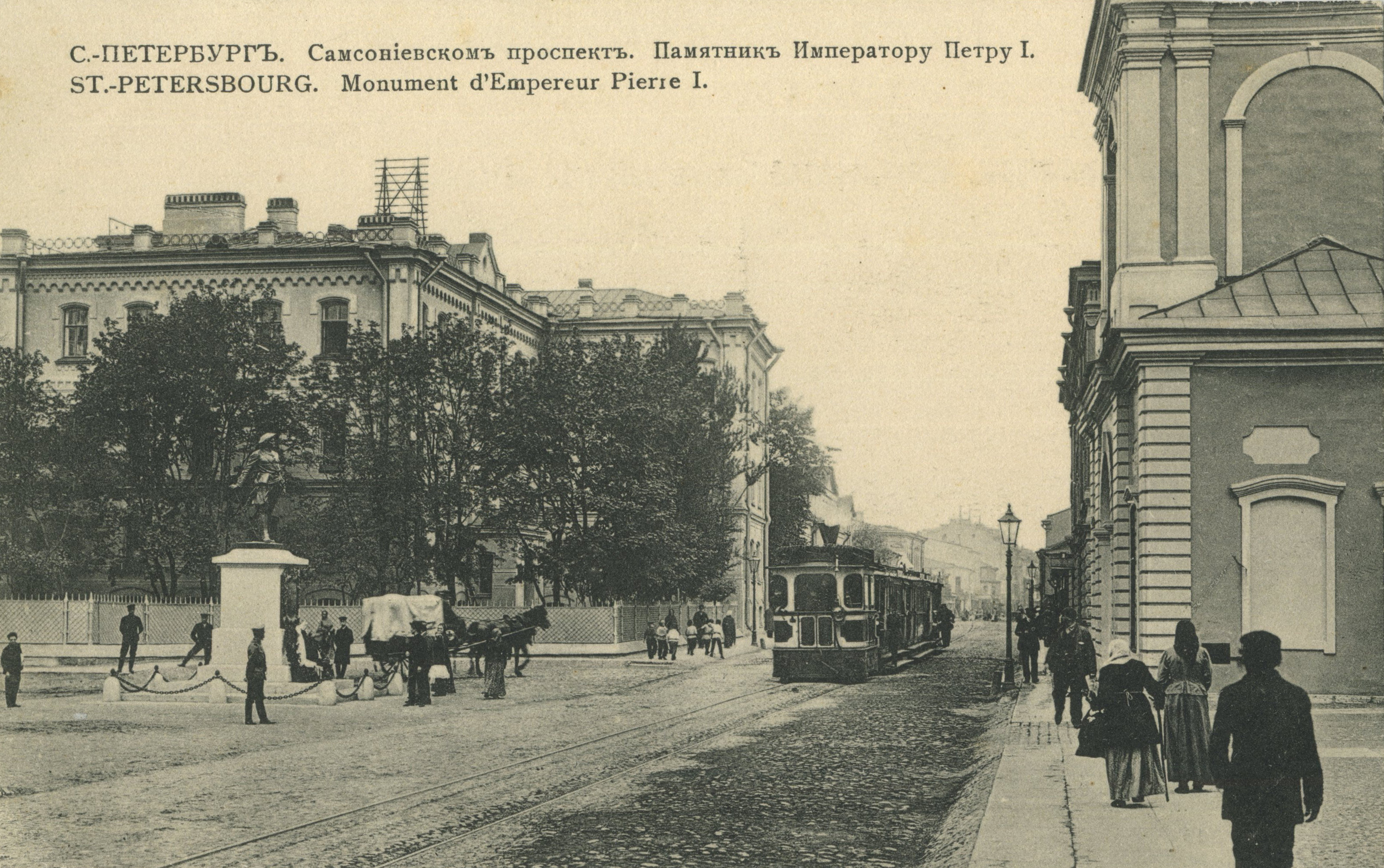
Early 20th-century view of Bolshoy Sampsoniyevskiy prospekt (Rus. "Greater Sampson's Avenue") between Monument to Peter the Great and Saint Sampson's Cathedral

The place behind the church was used as the city's first official cemetery, being located way off the city's center. Though the place was subordinate to the state Russian Orthodox Church, the name of Sampson the Hospitable was convenient to give the last shelter to remains of many foreigners from Western Europe of other Christian denominations who helped Peter and design and build the city, such as Domenico Trezzini, Jean-Baptiste Alexandre Le Blond and Carlo Bartolomeo Rastrelli. The graves has mostly been lost over the centuries, with most of the former cemetery converted into a quiet public garden. The memory of the city's first architects was commemorated for the city's tricentennial by Mikhail Shemyakin with a monument To First-Builders of Saint Petersburg. The memorial was made of an engraved Gothic granite arch with bronze details such as a drawing desk with the first city plan, an inkstand with a quill, and a memento mori - a human skull. All these bronze details have been since then stolen and never replaced (see photo).

The cemetery later also "accommodated" several members of the opposition to the Baltic German rule of Ernst Johann von Biron, made the regent of Russia after Empress Anna's will. The anti-Biron party was headed by her Cabinet minister Artemy Volynsky, who was executed together with architect Pyotr Yeropkin and another member of the group, Captain A.F.Khroushchev. The memory of their patriotic "plot" is marked by an 1880s black monument on their grave.

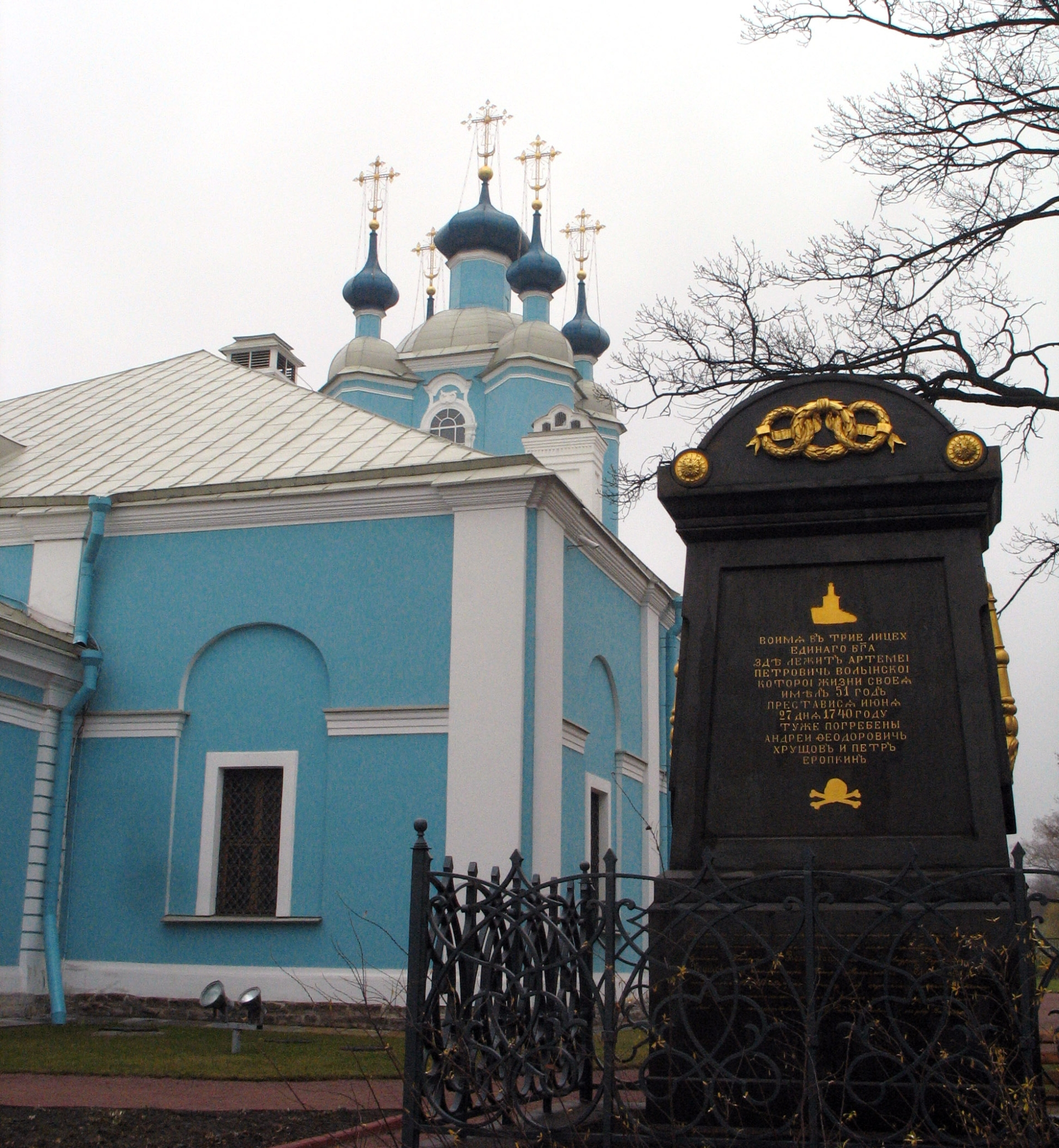
Gravestone monument to the executed Volynsky and his comrades next to Saint Sampson's Cathedral

The church gave the name of its title saint to the main thoroughfare of the district - the part of the road towards Vyborg within the city limits, Bolshoy Sampsoniyevskiy prospekt (Rus. "Greater Sampson's Avenue"), with Maly ("Lesser") Sampsoniyevskiy prospekt starting from the cathedral doors to the riverbank of the Bolshaya Nevka, one of the largest distributaries of the Neva.

The memory of the Great Northern War was also kept in the names of several streets in the district, e.g. Nishtadtskiy (Nystat) Prospekt (after the final peace settlement under the Treaty of Nystad, now part of Lesnoy Prospekt) and Neyshlotskiy Pereulok (Nyslot Lane) after a fortress Nyslot (now Savonlinna) taken by Russians after a month's siege in 1714.

=== Industrial area ===
Developing more slowly than centrally located city areas, the Vyborg Side yet had a number of factories, including sugar refineries, calico printers, food storehouses, brick kilns, a spinning yard, Dutch breweries by the 18th century. The Medico-Surgical Academy, the immediate precursor of the Academy of Military Medicine, was founded in 1798 as well as Prince Michael's Artillery School in 1820. The district was joined to the central, left-bank Liteynaya district of the city by a pontoon bridge and with Petergburgskaya side by another one. The Litneyney Bridge was completed in 1879.

The district became the city's largest industrial center during the late 19th century. It had, among others, New Arsenal, Rosenkrantz's copper-rolling and piping mill, Phoenix metalworks, Ludvig Nobel and Gustav Lessner's Lessner and New Lessner machine-building, Ericsson electrotechnical companies et al.

In 1917, the February Revolution began in the district as female factory workers went on strike in protest of the chronic food shortages facing the Russian Empire during the First World War. The demonstrations were joined by other workers in the city, and culminated in a garrison revolt and eventually the abdication of Nicholas II as the crisis spread nationwide.

Industrialists, such as Ludvig Nobel, commissioned apartment houses for their workers with various degrees of comfort inside the living space. Nobel's chosen architect was another Swedish national, well known locally F. Lidwal, whose Art Nouveau Nobel Block has survived at 20, Lesnoy prospekt. The practice was continued by the Soviet government in the 1930s along the same Lesnoy prospekt avenue with Constructivist architecture.

== Municipal division ==
The district is further divided into several municipal okrugs:

Name	Population
Vyborgsky District (Выборгский район)	419,567
Municipal settlements under the district's jurisdiction:
Levashovo (Левашово)	4,095
Pargolovo (Парголово)	12,225
Municipal okrugs under the district's jurisdiction:
#15(№ 15)	64,320
Sergiyevskoye (Сергиевское)	67,709
Sampsoniyevskoye (Сампсониевское)	39,250
Shuvalovo-Ozerki (Шувалово-Озерки)	87,511
Sosnovskoye (Сосновское)	60,675
Svetlanovskoye (Светлановское)	83,782

== Gallery ==
Objects of interest in the southernmost Sampsoniyevskoye municipal okrug:

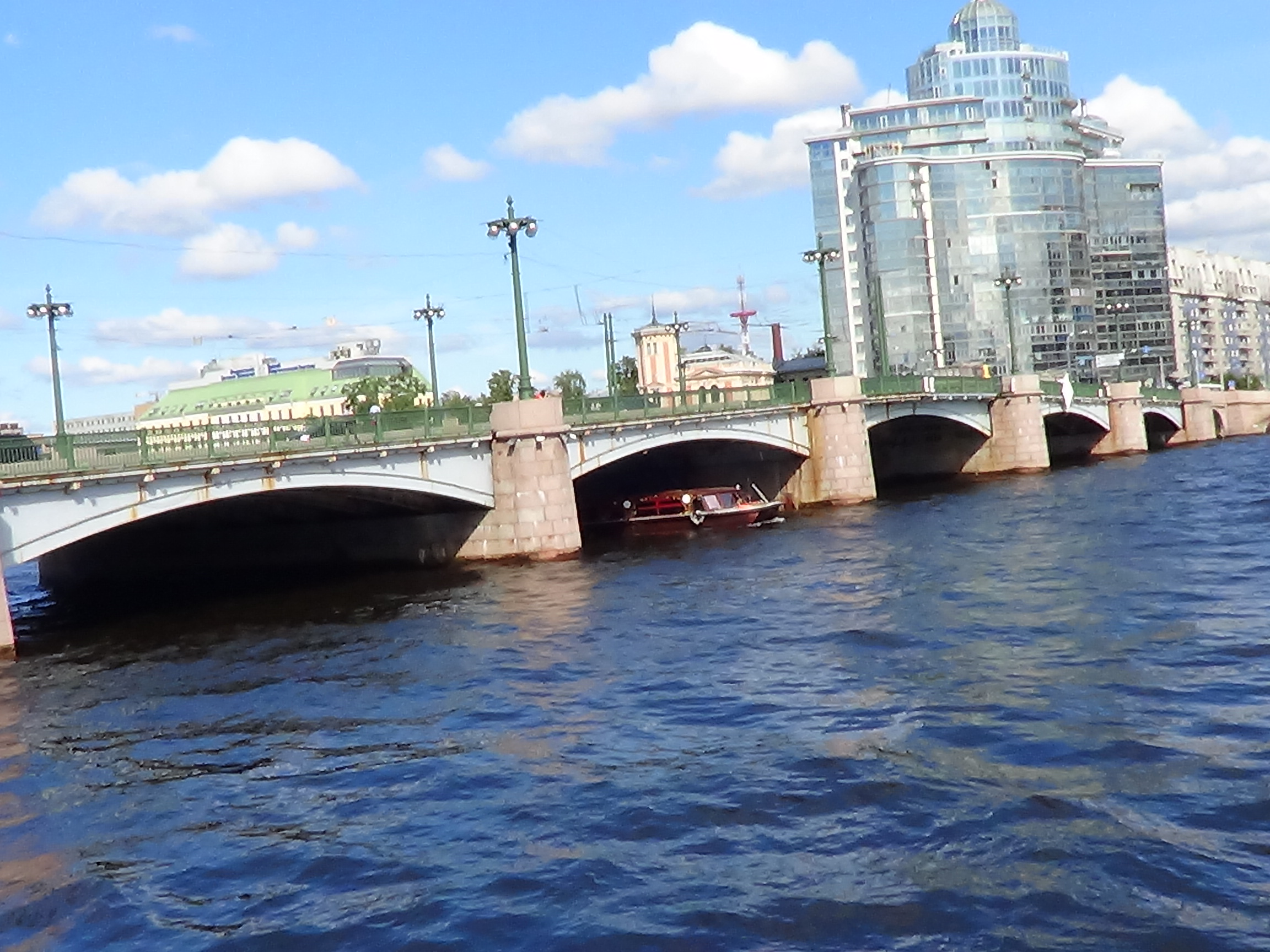
A new Monblan (Montblanc) apartment high-rise overshadowing a miniature Nobel family mansion to the left of it with redeveloped former Ludvig Nobel's factory (nationalised and known as Russian Diesel motor works in the Soviet years) to the left of the mansion.

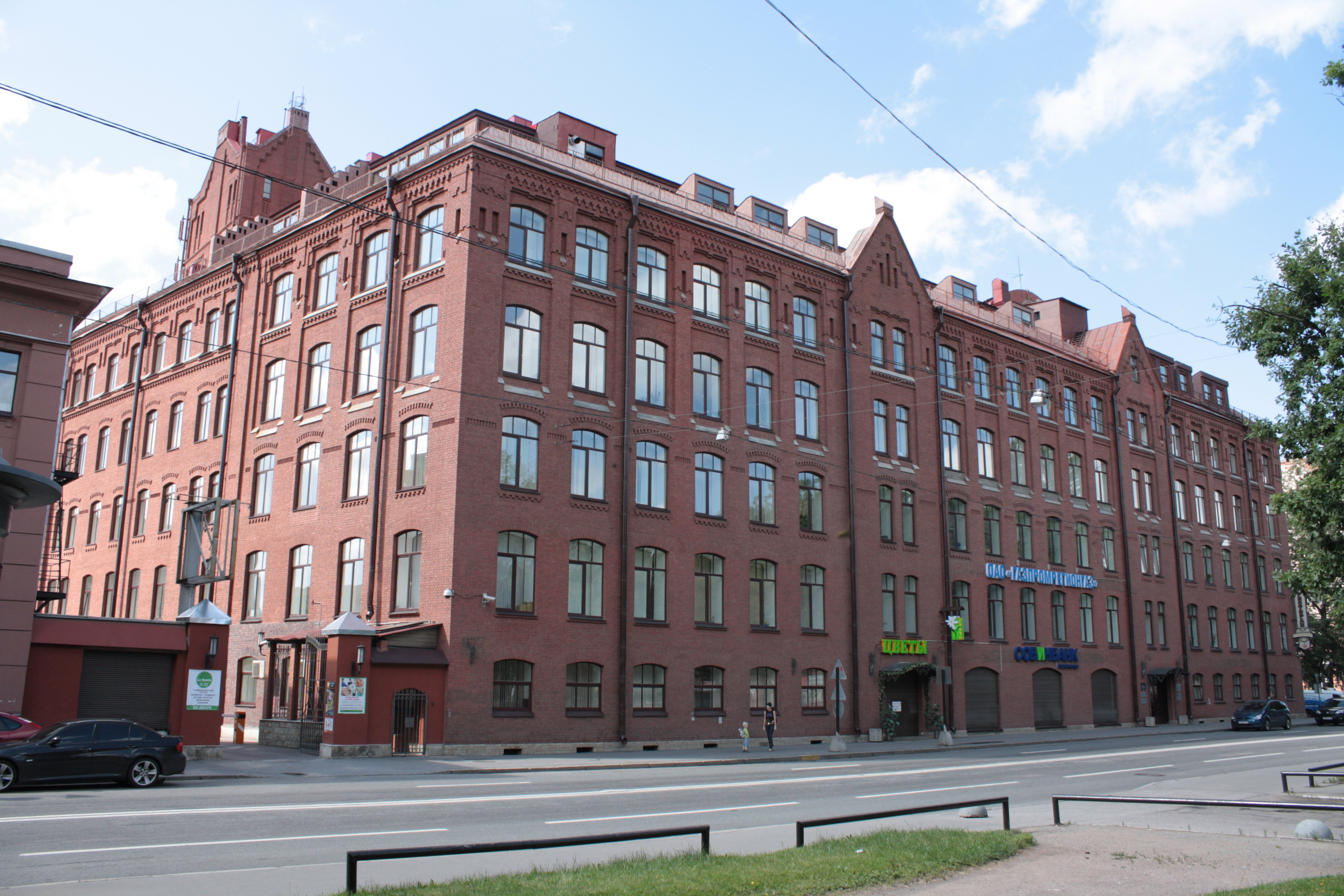
Redeveloped 19th-century red-brick Ericsson telephone factory (Soviet name Krasnaya Zarya (Red Dawn)) - a typical example of local industrial architecture of the time.

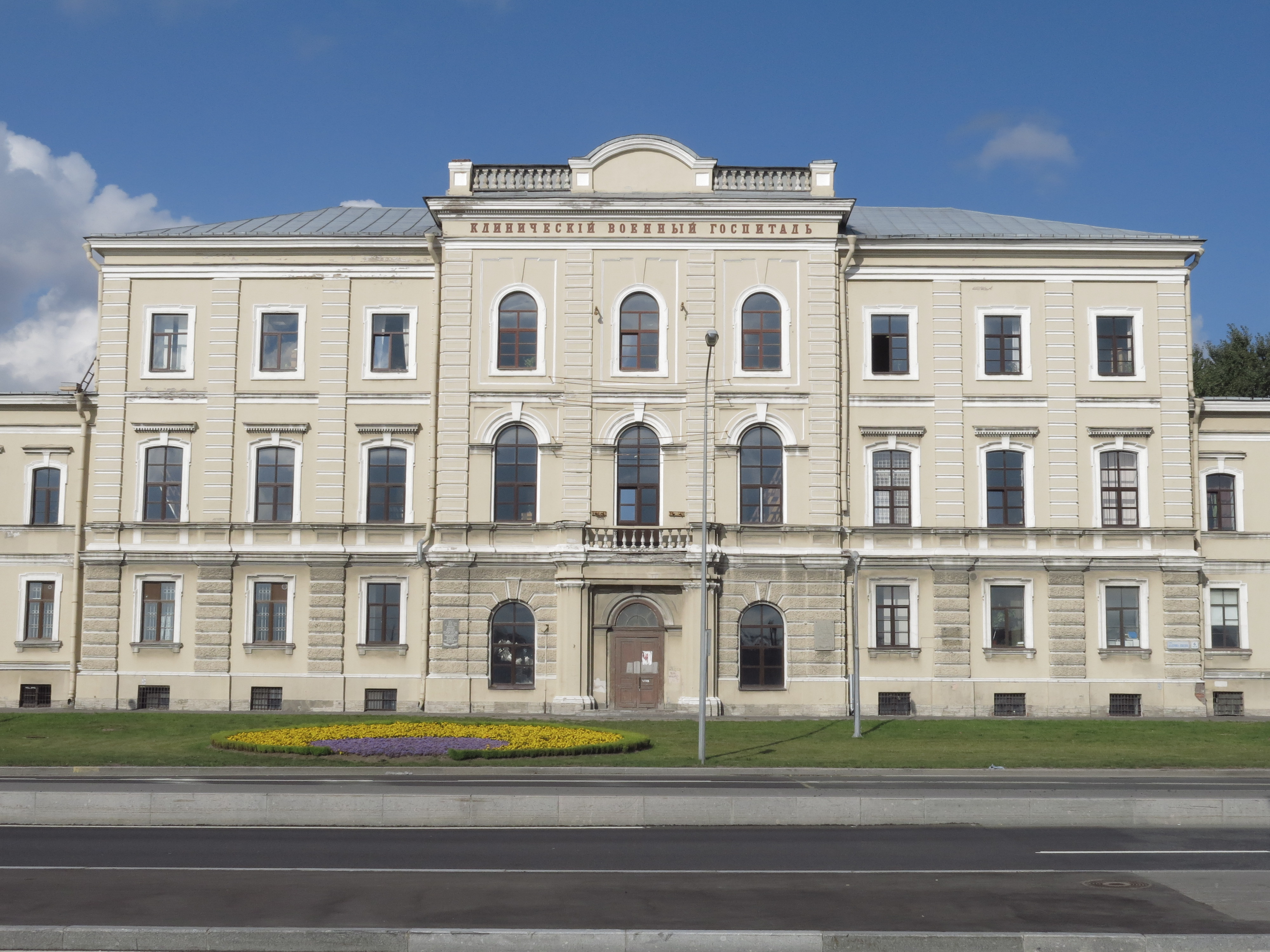
Central part of Naval and Land Forces Hospital, now a part of campus of Military Medicine Academy.

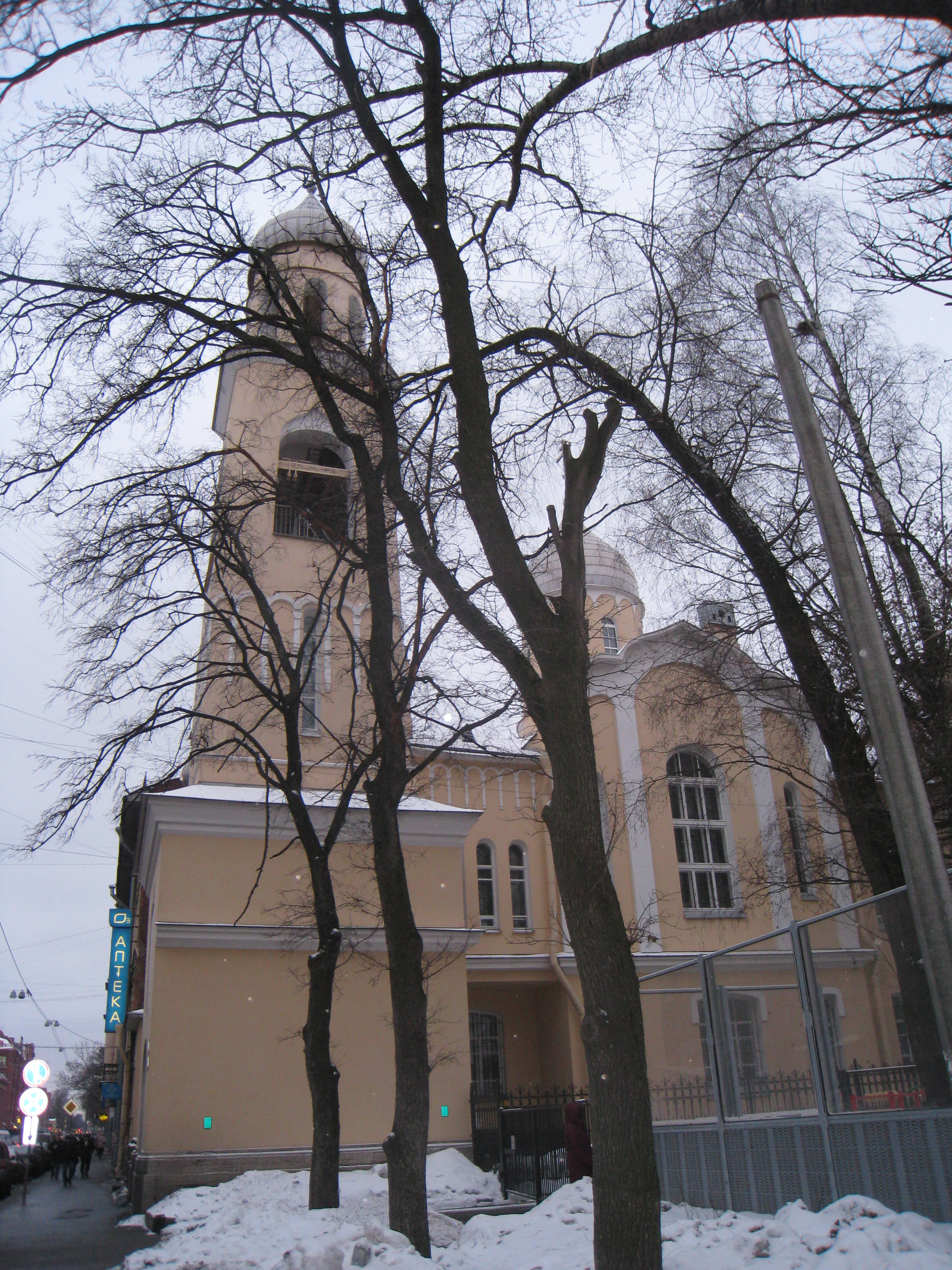
Church of St Princess Anna of Kashin.

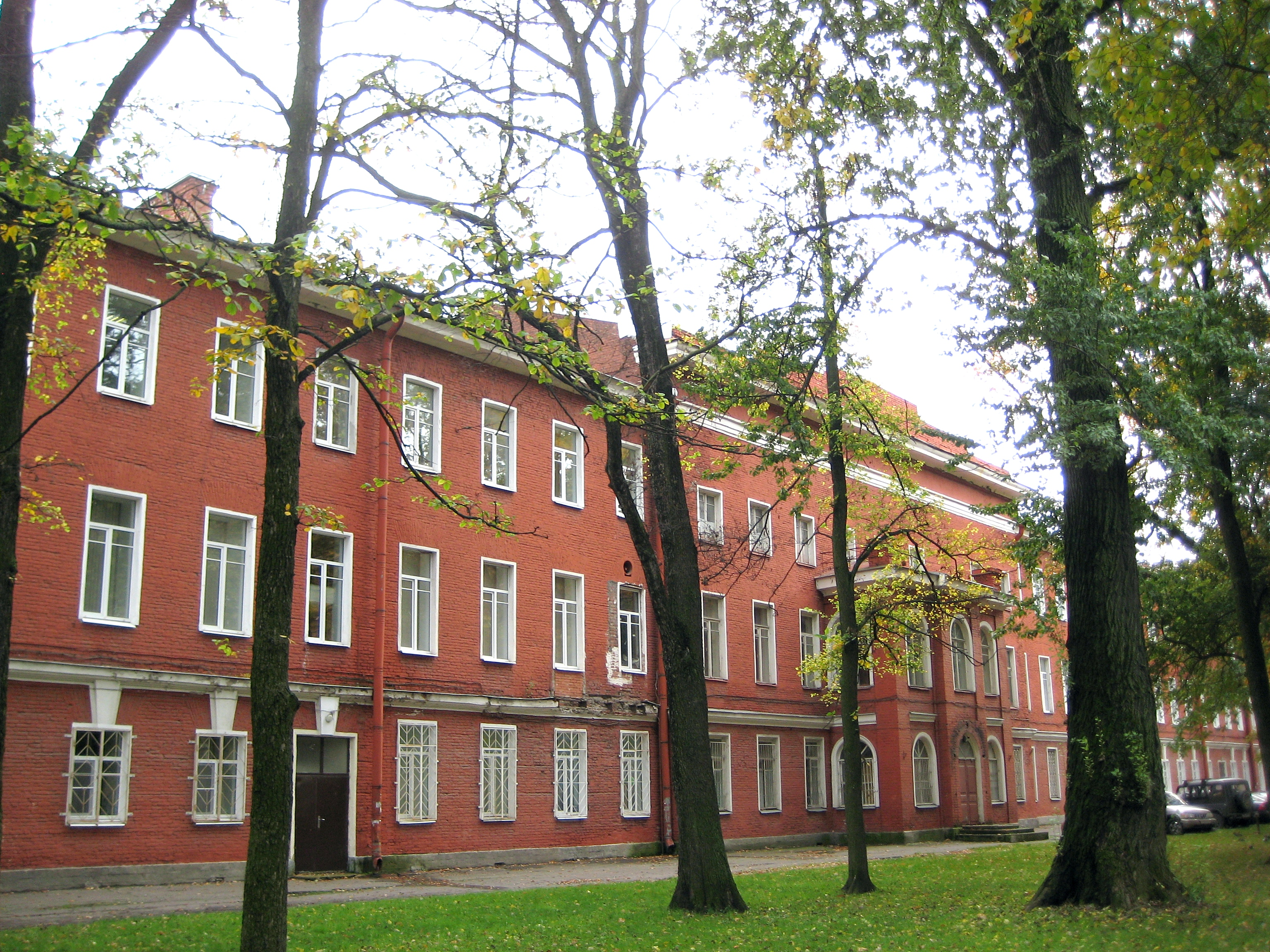
Barracks of the former Moscow Regiment (previously I Lithuanian Regiment) of the Imperial Guards (61, B.Sampsonievsky pr.). 1833–1836. Now buildings of Military Academy of Physical Education.

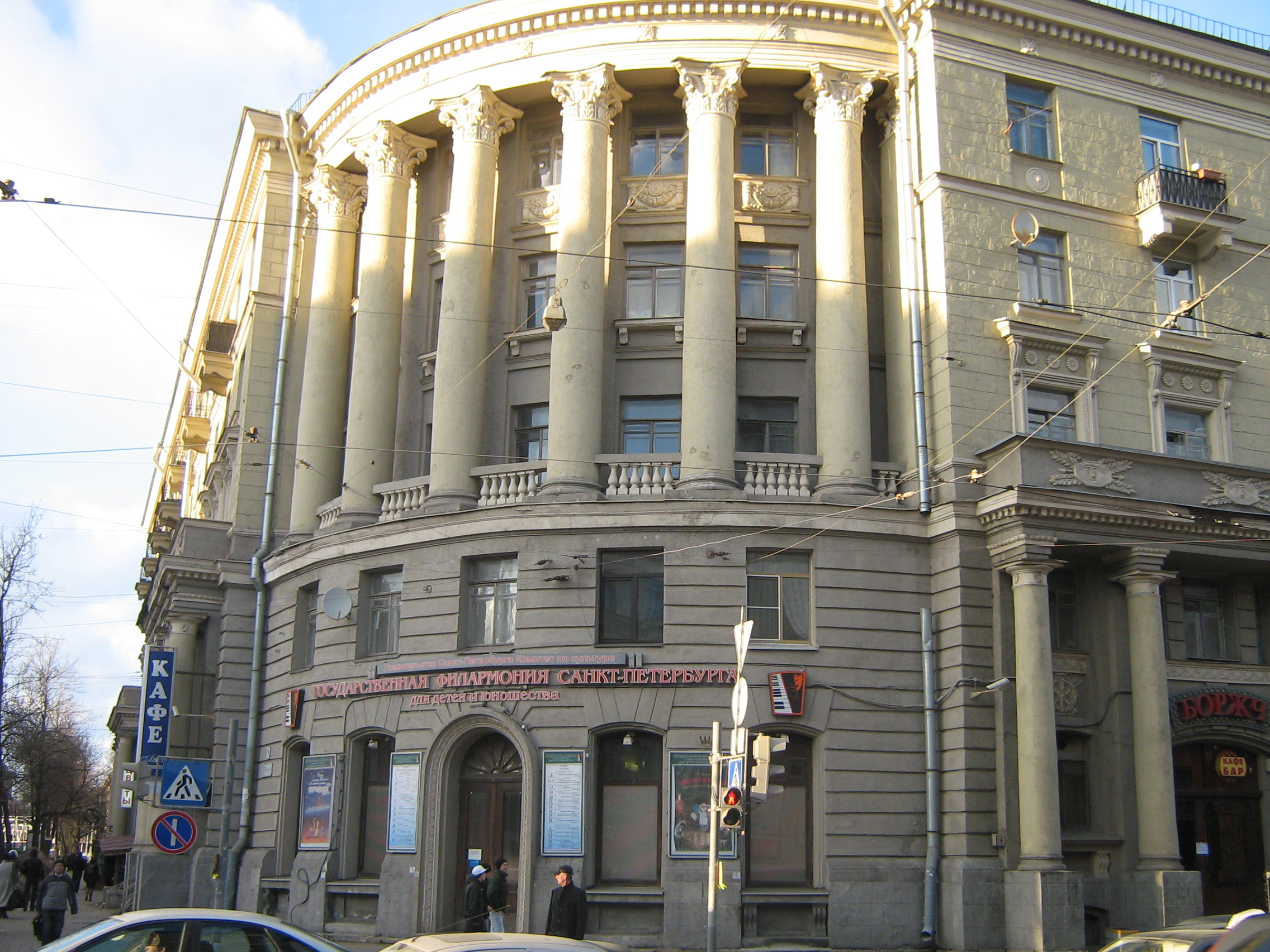
Front of a 1950s apartment building with a cinema downstairs now given to the city's Philharmonic Hall for Children and Youth.

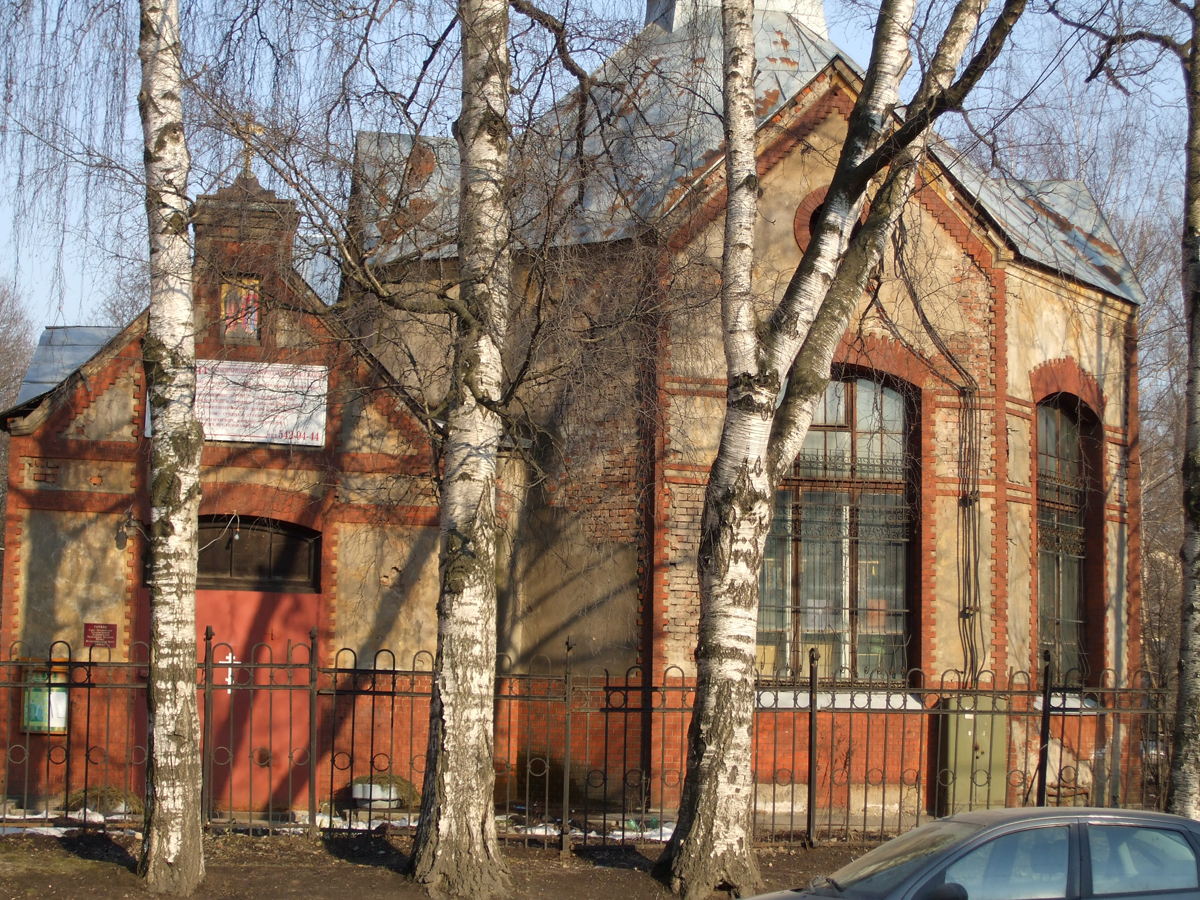
Chapel at Pediatrics Academy dedicated to the martyred last Tsar and Tsarina of Russia.

== See also ==
- Administrative divisions of Saint Petersburg
