= Dagestan (disambiguation) =

Dagestan or Daghestan may refer to:

- Republic of Dagestan, a federal subject of Russia
- Dagestan Autonomous Soviet Socialist Republic (1921–1991), an administrative division of the Russian SFSR, Soviet Union
- Dagestan Oblast (1860-1917), province of the Russian Empire
- Safavid Daghestan, a province of the Safavid Empire of Iran
- 2297 Daghestan, asteroid
- Dagestan, a Gepard-class frigate laid down in 1994 and currently active in the Russian Caspian Sea fleet.
