= Russo-Iranian treaty of 1717 =

1717 treaty between Russia and Iran

The Russo-Iranian treaty of 1717 was concluded in late July 1717 between the Tsardom of Russia and Safavid Iran. The treaty was facilitated by Russian ambassador Artemy Volynsky and Safavid Grand Vizier Fath-Ali Khan Daghestani. Incumbent Tsar Peter I (r. 1682–1725) ratified the treaty in July 1719. His Iranian counterpart, King (Shah) Sultan Husayn (r. 1694–1722), ratified it in 1720. It was the first formal bilateral agreement between Iran and Russia.

However, at the time of its signing, Iran was in a state of great unrest and therefore its terms were "widely disregarded and ignored". The historian Rudi Matthee noted: "The massive unrest in Iran that followed shortly made practical implementation utterly impossible." A few years later, in 1722, when the Safavid state had already entered the final stages of collapse, Russia used the treaty combination with the deaths of Russian merchants in the 1721 sack of Shamakhi as the casus belli to invade Iran.

== Background ==
By the first decade of the 18th century, the once-prosperous Safavid realm was in a state of serious decline, with insurrections in numerous parts of its domains. The king, Sultan Husayn, was a weak ruler, and although personally inclined to be more humane, flexible, and relaxed than his chief mullah, he went along with the recommendations of his advisers regarding important state decisions. He reigned as a "stationary monarch", preferring, apart from the occasional hunting party, to be inside or near the capital of Isfahan at all times, invisible to all "but the most intimate of courtiers". Having seen not much more of the world than the harem walls, he had quickly fallen under the spell of the leading ulama, most notably Mohammad-Baqer Majlesi.

Many of the ambitious Russian ruler Peter the Great's (Peter I) political ambitions were aimed at Iran. One of these was to have full control over Iranian silk exports. Russian rulers before Peter I had tried to spark Iranian interest in exporting Iranian silk to Europe through Russia. Though official orders were issued by Russian rulers to benefit the Safavid Empire's Armenian merchants, they were ineffective. The Armenians continued to carry their silk to Europe through the Ottoman Empire rather than through Russia. In 1711, Peter I decided to issue additional privileges for Safavid merchants, but as with previous Russian efforts they failed to achieve their objective.

== Embassy ==
Realizing that his efforts had been in vain, Peter I decided to appoint Artemy Volynsky as his new ambassador to Iran in 1715. He tasked Volynsky with gathering information about Iran's military strength, silk producing provinces, and the nation's main agricultural and mineral resources. He was to convince the Iranian King of the advantages of the Russia-trade route over the Ottoman route and to spark his interest in an agreement which would benefit the Russia trade route. Volynsky had to stipulate that to facilitate such an idea, Russian merchants had to be free of obstacles within Iran. In relation to that, he was ordered to mention that Russian merchants were the victim of local Safavid governors, who "confiscated their goods without payment", and suffered from "intrigues" by Safavid merchants, especially those from New Julfa (the Armenian quarter of Isfahan). Furthermore, he had to stipulate that Daghestani robbers and bandits targeted Russian merchants, and a number of them had been taken captive in the past. Lastly, he had to demand the Iranian government put pressure on Armenian traders from New Julfa "to honor their commitment" in relation to the privileges already given to them by Russia.

Volynsky departed from Saint Petersburg in 1715, reached Astrakhan after a year, and arrived in Niazabad (Note: Known as "Nizovoi" in Russian, Niazabad was an Iranian port 40 km (25 mi) to the northeast of Shamakhi on the Caspian littoral, to the south of Derbent. Though it was "hardly" an ideal harbor according to Matthee, Niazabad was only one of few viable ports on the western littoral of the Caspian Sea.) in the autumn of 1716. He arrived in Isfahan six months later as he was "held up" in Shamakhi and Tabriz with "quasi-autonomous local officials". According to his own writings, the treatment he received in the royal capital was "little better". He became embroiled in disagreements about protocol as he had asked whether he could "follow the Russian custom of riding his horse all the way to the Shah's quarters and whether he would be able to hand his credentials to the Safavid ruler in person and in full regalia". During his stay in Iran, Volynsky reportedly became the target of "endless humiliations", for, as Matthee notes, the Iranians had "long despised Russians for their uncouthness". The negotiations were conducted between Volynsky and Fath-Ali Khan Daghestani, the Iranian Grand Vizier.

Fears of Russian military plans grew acute at the same time when it was discovered the Russians, as part of the Bekovich-Cherkassky mission, had recently built fortifications on the eastern littoral of the Caspian Sea. Rumors were spread that Russian ships had been spotted near Gilan. Suspicious of these developments, the Iranians questioned Volynsky about these matters, and Russia's intentions. Concluding that Volynsky was a spy, and concerned that a long stay in Isfahan could allow him "to gain a full picture of Iran's lamentable military state" negotiations were kept short. Some of Volynsky's requests were declined. In line with policy held since the 1640s, Fath-Ali Khan Daghestani rejected the Russian request to form an anti-Ottoman alliance. The Grand Vizier declined Volynsky's request for "retroactive compensation" for the economic losses of some of the Russian merchants in the past. But the Vizier did promise protection for Russian merchants in future. Fath-Ali Khan Daghestani stated that the Lezgins were Safavid subjects. Since they did not obey Safavid laws the state was not responsible for past issues with the Lezgins. Fath-Ali Khan also declined Volynsky's spurious requests to grand special rights to the Russian silk merchants and to find a "more accommodating harbor than Niazabad". According to Fath-Ali Khan, granting the Russian merchants special privileges would make it less likely merchants from the Ottoman Empire and other nations would come to Iran. A different harbor would entail only benefits for Russia. Matthee adds that the Iranians "no doubt" feared a possible Russian "strategic interest in a new harbor". Despite the tough talks, Volynsky and Fath-Ali Khan Daghestani concluded an agreement in late July 1717.

== Terms ==
According to the terms of the treaty:

1. Russia was allowed to conduct trade in all parts of the Safavid Empire.
2. Iran promised to guarantee and ensure the protection of Russian nationals within the Safavid Empire against thieves and bandits.
3. Russian merchants were allowed to purchase silk in Gilan and Mazandaran.
4. Iran promised to safeguard convoys of Russian merchants travelling between Shamakhi and Niazabad, which was considered to be an unsafe road.
5. Russia was allowed to establish a consulate in Isfahan (and later in Gilan), thus stationing resident Russian consuls and vice-consuls in Iran (effected in 1720).

== Assessment and aftermath ==
At the time the treaty was signed, Iran was in a state of great unrest, and therefore its terms were "widely disregarded and ignored". The historian Rudi Matthee notes: "The massive unrest in Iran that followed shortly made practical implementation utterly impossible." Though the Iranians tried to prevent Volynsky from staying for too long in Iran, he managed to gather the information Peter I had asked him to collect. He had noticed the serious decline of the state and in 1717–1718 Volynsky reported to Peter I "the country was extremely weak and an easy target for an outside power". In the words of Matthee: "Drawing attention to what he [Volynsky] saw as the inability of the military to defend Iran against domestic rebels and outside aggressors, he presciently foresaw the destruction of the Safavid state."

The treaty is considered important in the history of relations between Iran and Russia, for it was the first formal bilateral agreement between the two countries. It also resulted in a large influx of Russian merchants into Iranian commercial markets. The establishment of a resident Russian consul was also important. It was a special right granted to the Russians, and the consul's role in subsequent events stipulated his importance to the regulation of relations between the two countries (in particular in defending the interests of the Russian merchants within Iran). The consul later received vice-consuls who were stationed in other towns in the Safavid Empire (such as in Shamakhi), who were to facilitate Russia's political goals. No provision included the Safavid Armenian merchants and the silk route they used. According to Matttee, Armenian "scheming" against Volynsky may have prevented this, for the powerful New Julfan Armenian trade monopoly wanted to "safeguard" their Anatolia route. According to Volynsky, Fath-Ali Khan Daghestani told him "he would be unable to force the Armenians to transport all their wares via Russia".

Four years after the signing of the treaty, in 1721, the Safavid city of Shamakhi was sacked and looted by Lezgin rebels. Volynsky reported to Peter the Great on the considerable harm done to the Russian merchants and their livelihoods. The report stipulated that the 1721 event was a clear violation of the 1717 Russo–Iranian trade treaty, by which the latter had guaranteed to protect Russian nationals within the Safavid domains. With the Safavid realm in chaos, and the Safavid ruler unable to fulfill the provisions of the treaty, Volynsky urged Peter to take advantage of the situation and to invade Iran on the pretext of restoring order as an ally of the Safavid king. Shortly afterward, Russia used the attack on its merchants in Shamakhi as a pretext to launch the Russo-Persian War of 1722–1723. The episode brought trade between Iran and Russia to a standstill, and made the city of Astrakhan the terminus for the Volga trade route.

By the end of the Zand era (late 18th century), the 1717 treaty became the reference point for all future agreements between Russia and Iran. "[T]wo paragraphs from it (concerning the residence of the Russian consul in Iran and free trade of Russians) were included in all subsequent contracts".

== Sources ==
- Atkin, Muriel (1980). Russia and Iran, 1780–1828. University of Minnesota Press. ISBN 978-0-8166-5697-4.
- Axworthy, Michael (2010). The Sword of Persia: Nader Shah, from Tribal Warrior to Conquering Tyrant. I.B. Tauris. ISBN 978-0-85772-193-8.
- Lockhart, Laurence (1958). The Fall of the Safavī Dynasty and the Afghan Occupation of Persia. Cambridge University Press.
- Matthee, Rudolph P. (1999). The Politics of Trade in Safavid Iran: Silk for Silver, 1600–1730. Cambridge: Cambridge University Press. p. 120. ISBN 978-0-521-64131-9.
- Matthee, Rudolph P. (2005). The Pursuit of Pleasure: Drugs and Stimulants in Iranian History, 1500–1900. Princeton University Press. ISBN 978-0-691-11855-0.
- Matthee, Rudi (2012). Persia in Crisis: Safavid Decline and the Fall of Isfahan. London: I.B.Tauris. pp. 1–371. ISBN 978-1-84511-745-0.
- Kazemzadeh, Firuz (1991). "Iranian relations with Russia and the Soviet Union, to 1921". In Avery, Peter; Hambly, Gavin; Melville, Charles (eds.). The Cambridge History of Iran. Vol. 7. Cambridge University Press. ISBN 978-0-521-20095-0.
- Rashtiani, Goodarz (2018). "Iranian–Russian Relations in the Eighteenth Century". In Axworthy, Michael (ed.). Crisis, Collapse, Militarism and Civil War: The History and Historiography of 18th Century Iran. Oxford University Press. ISBN 978-0190250331.
- Sicker, Martin (2001). The Islamic World in Decline: From the Treaty of Karlowitz to the Disintegration of the Ottoman Empire. Greenwood Publishing Group. ISBN 978-0-275-96891-5.
