= Volynsky =

Volynsky may refer to:

- Artemy Volynsky (1689–1740), Russian statesman and diplomat
- Volodymyr-Volynskyi, Ukrainian city

== See also ==
- Novohrad-Volynskyi, a city in Zhytomyr Oblast, northern Ukraine
- Novohrad-Volynskyi Raion, an administrative district in Zhytomyr Oblast
