= Vasily Trediakovsky =

Russian poet, translator and philologist (1703–1769)

- Василий Тредиаковский
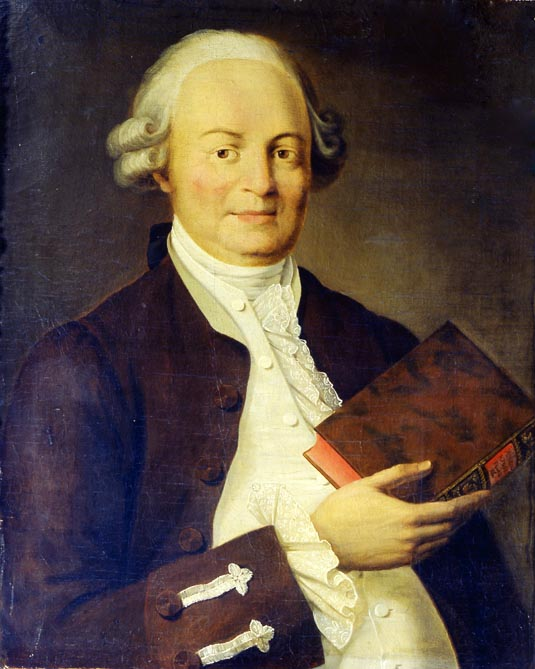
- Portrait by Fyodor Rokotov
- Born: Vasily Kirillovich Trediakovsky; 5 March 1703; Astrakhan, Tsardom of Russia
- Died: 17 August 1769 (aged 66); St. Petersburg, Russian Empire
- Occupations: Writer; playwright; philologist

Vasily Kirillovich Trediakovsky (Russian: Василий Кириллович Тредиаковский; 5 March [O.S. 22 February] 1703 – 17 August [O.S. 6 August] 1769) was a Russian poet, essayist and playwright who helped lay the foundations of classical Russian literature.

== Biography ==
The son of a poor priest, Trediakovsky became the first Russian commoner to receive a humanistic education abroad, at the Sorbonne in Paris (1727–1730) where he studied philosophy, linguistics and mathematics. Soon after his return to Russia, he became acting secretary of the Academy of Sciences and de facto court poet.

In 1735, Trediakovsky published A New and Brief Way for Composing of Russian Verses (Novy i kratky sposob k slozheniyu rossiyskikh stikhov), a highly theoretical work for which he is best remembered. It discussed for the first time in Russian literature such poetic genres as the sonnet, the rondeau, the madrigal, and the ode.

In 1740, Trediakovsky received a physical beating at the hands of the imperial minister Artemy Volynsky. Volynsky was arrested on charges of conspiracy and misconduct, but Trediakovsky became, "a subject of constant mockery", according to Elif Batuman: "His very propensity for receiving physical abuse became a popular comic premise."

In 1748, his A Conversation on Orthography (Razgovor ob orfografii) appeared, which was the first study of the phonetic structure of the Russian language. He continued his advocacy of poetic reform in On Ancient, Middle, and New Russian Poetry (O drevney, sredney i novoy rossiyskoy poyezii) in 1752.

Trediakovsky was also a prolific translator of classical authors, medieval philosophers, and French literature. His translations frequently aroused the ire of the censors, and he fell into disfavour with his Academy superiors and conservative court circles. In 1759, he was dismissed from the Academy. His last major work was a translation of François Fénelon's Les Aventures de Télémaque (1766; Tilemakhida), which he rendered in Russian hexameters. His works marked the transition from syllabic versification to metric verse, more suited to the sound of the Russian tongue.

== See also ==
- Mikhail Lomonosov, who created the basis of the modern Russian literary language
