= Saint Sampson's Cathedral =

Oldest surviving church in St. Petersburg, Russia

Coordinates: 59.968369°N 30.34281°E

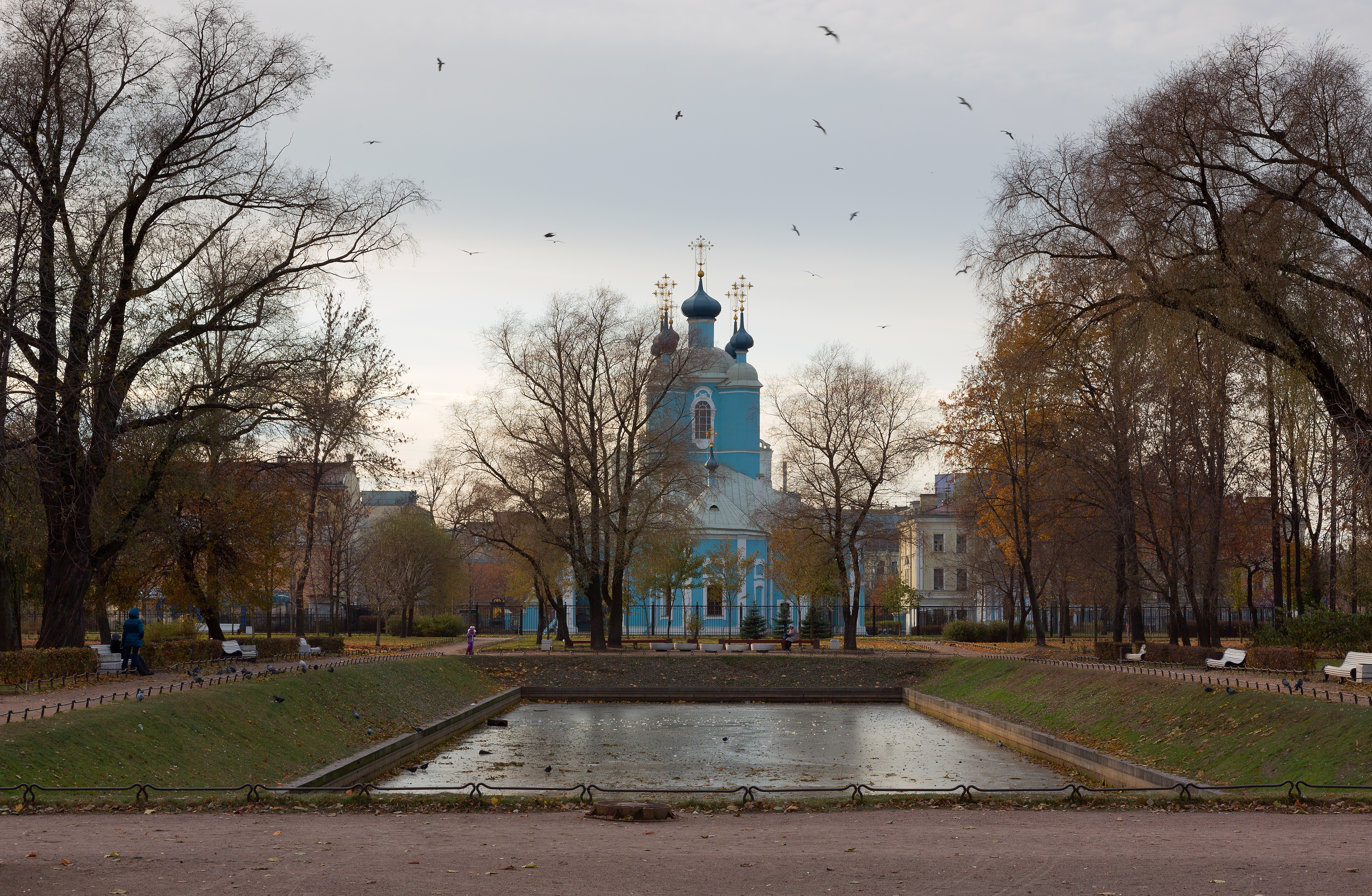
A small park near Sampsonievsky Cathedral

St Sampson's Cathedral (Rus. Сампсониевский собор) is the oldest surviving church in St. Petersburg. It stands on the northern outskirts of the city and gives its name to Sampsonievsky Avenue. Rumor has it that it was in St. Sampson's Church that Catherine II of Russia secretly married Grigory Potemkin in 1774.

The original wooden church was built in 1710 to honor Sampson the Hospitable. It was on the feast day of that saint that Peter the Great defeated Charles XII of Sweden in the Battle of Poltava. The existing church was built under Empress Anna to a design by Pietro Antonio Trezzini. It was consecrated in 1740. The tent-like belltower was built at a later date. The original church had only one dome; the four subsidiary domes were added in 1761.

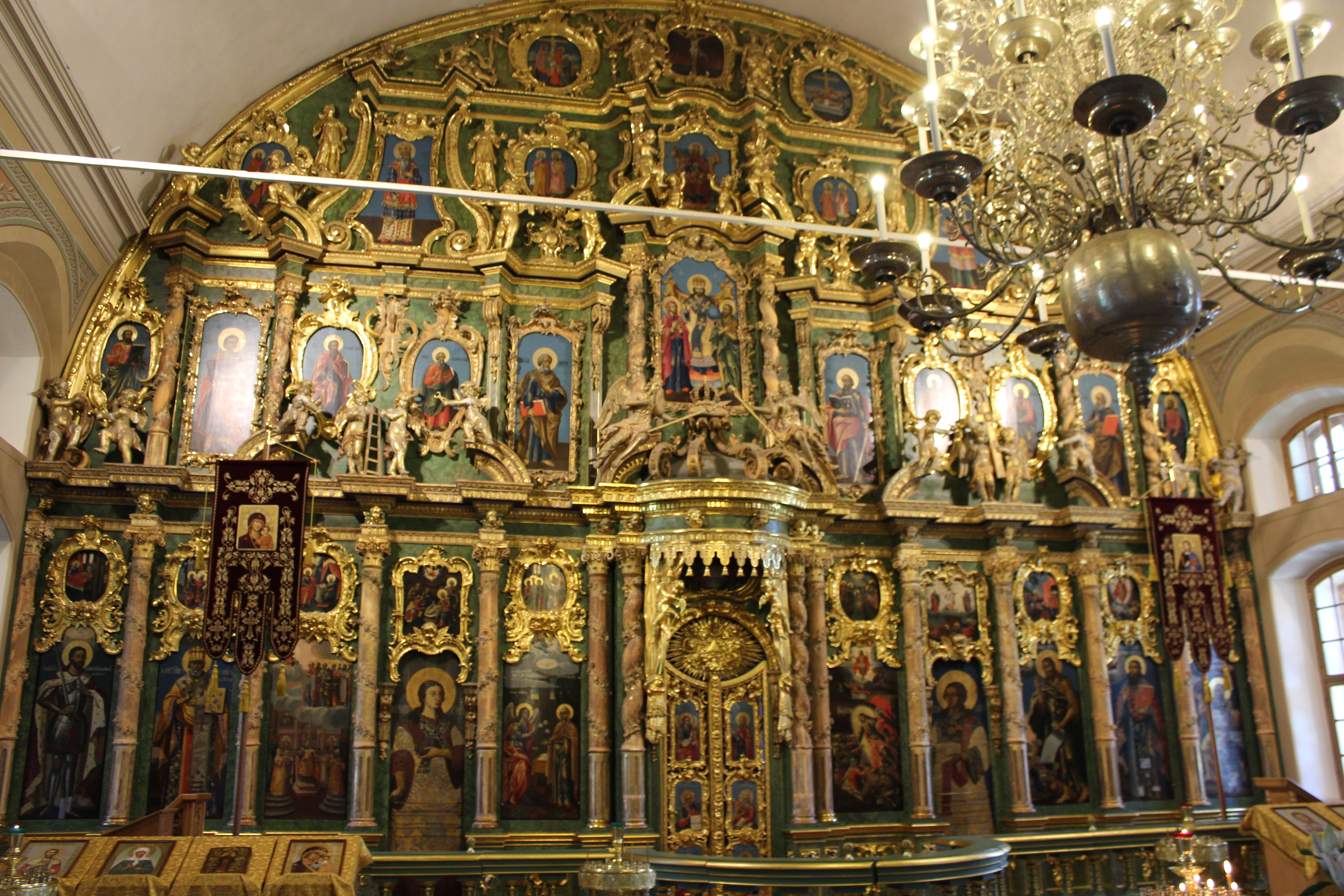
The Baroque icon screen

The church was considerably renovated as part of the battle's bicentennial celebrations. A Rastrelliesque chapel was constructed on the grounds, and Peter I's address to his soldiers at Poltava was inscribed on the wall. It was at that time that the church was elevated to cathedral status. The parish was disbanded by the Soviets in the 1930s, and the building was converted into a warehouse. It was restored in the late 1970s and reopened in 2000 as a museum attached to St. Isaac's Cathedral.

The grave yard which surrounds the church has been filled for centuries. Some of the city's first foreign architects, including Jean-Baptiste Alexandre Le Blond and Domenico Trezzini, were buried there. The tomb of Artemy Volynsky and Pyotr Yeropkin (both executed exactly 31 years after the Poltava victory) is by Alexander Opekushin (1885). The statue of Peter the Great in front of the cathedral was designed by Mark Antokolsky. It was removed by the Soviets and restored in 2003 as part of the city's tercentenary celebrations.

On 5 February 2017 the cathedral was transferred from the state to the Russian Orthodox Church at a ceremony in the cathedral. During the ceremony, which started with Divine Liturgy, the director of the Museum Complex of St. Isaac's Cathedral, which managed St. Sampson's Cathedral, officially handed the keys of the cathedral to Archimandrite Seraphim, noting that it was "with a feeling of deep satisfaction". The Archimandrite called the transfer a historic day and said it was the beginning of a new page in the cathedral's history, and he thanked the museum complex for preserving the cathedral.
