= Sampson the Hospitable =

Byzantine saint (died c. 530)

Saint Sampson

The Hospitable
- Born: Rome, Kingdom of Odoacer (modern-day Italy)
- Died: c. 530; Constantinople, Eastern Roman Empire (modern-day Istanbul, Turkey)
- Venerated in: Eastern Orthodox Church; Eastern Catholic Churches; Catholic Church
- Feast: June 27

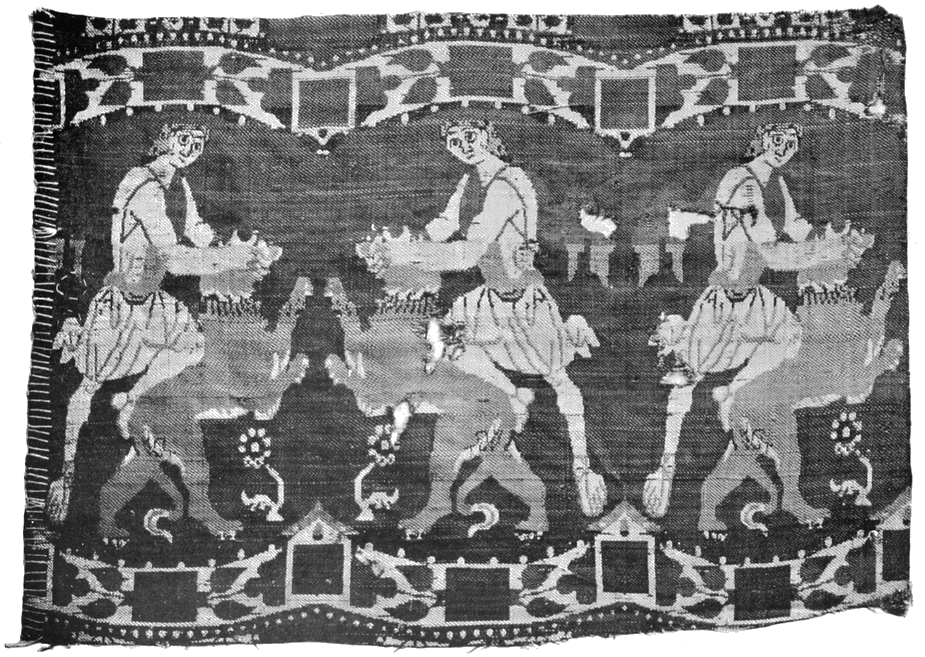
Figured silk textile representing Samson, 6th or 7th century

Sampson the Hospitable (Greek: Σαμψὼν ὁ φιλόξενος, Sampsón ho philóxenos; died c. 530 AD) was a citizen of Constantinople who devoted his time to serving the poor of the city.

He is venerated as a saint in the Eastern Churches as well in the Catholic Church.

== Life ==
Sampson (or Samson) was born in Rome to a prominent and devout family. He became a physician who devoted much of his time to helping the poor and sick. He inherited a fortune, much of which he distributed to the poor. Sampson turned his home into a free clinic, providing his patients with food and lodging as well as medical care. He trained a staff to care for the large numbers coming to seek both medical and spiritual attention.

"He moved to Constantinople, where he lived in a tiny house from which he distributed alms, comfort, advice, hope, medicine and all possible aid to those suffering in spirit and in body." He was later ordained a priest by the patriarch.

When the Byzantine emperor Justinian the Great became ill he sent for Sampson to cure him. He was the only physician in the city to do the emperor any good, and the emperor wanted to reward him. Sampson requested that the emperor help him establish a new hospital for the poor. With the emperor's assistance, Samson founded the hospital, which became the largest free clinic in the empire and served the people of Constantinople for 600 years. It was located between St. Eirene's church and Hagia Sophia.

Sampson was buried in the Church of the Holy Martyr Mocius in Constantinople. It was on his feast day that Peter the Great defeated Charles XII of Sweden in the Battle of Poltava. This led to his veneration in Russia, including the construction of St Sampson's Cathedral in St. Petersburg.
