= Pyotr Yeropkin =

Russian architect (1698–1740)

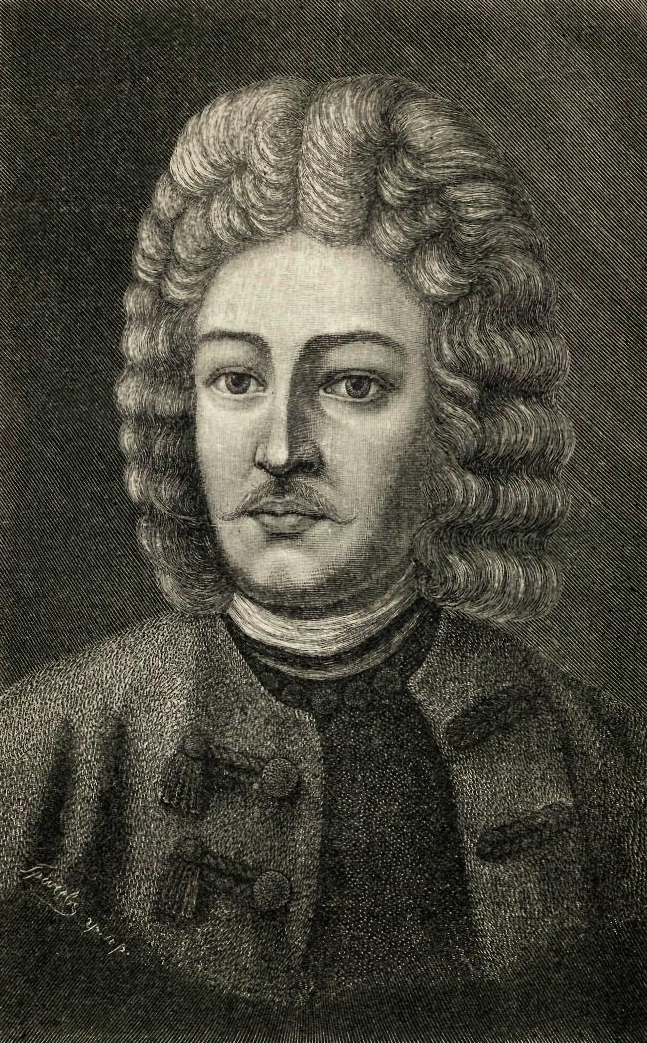
Peter M. Yeropkin

Pyotr Mikhailovich Yeropkin (ca. 1698–1740) was a Russian architect credited with replanning Saint Petersburg after Peter the Great's death. It was Yeropkin who designed the famous Trident of the Nevsky, Voznesensky, and Gorokhovaya thoroughfares as the city's structural center. He demanded that "no obstacle to the view of the Admiralty spire should be permitted" and insisted on the primacy of the embankments.

The scion of a noble family, Yeropkin was one of the first professionally trained Russian architects. After 8-years study in Italy he worked in St. Petersburg under Domenico Trezzini and Niccolo Michetti. He was a relative of Artemy Volynsky, one of Empress Anne's closest advisors, and built the notorious ice palace on her request. Among his major commissions were the palaces for Chancellor Osterman, Prince Tcherkassky, and Volynsky. After Volynsky's fall from grace he was tried and executed with him.

Empress Elizabeth had a monument erected to Yeropkin's memory near his tomb in St. Sampson's Cathedral. The current memorial by Alexander Opekushin was raised in the late 19th century at the behest of historian Mikhail Semevsky. No buildings by Yeropkin survive, but he is still remembered as the first ethnically Russian town-planner and the first translator of Palladio's books into Russian.
