= Safavid Daghestan =

Velayat (province) of Safavid Iran (1501-1736)

Safavid Daghestan Velāyat-e Dâghestân
- 1501–1736
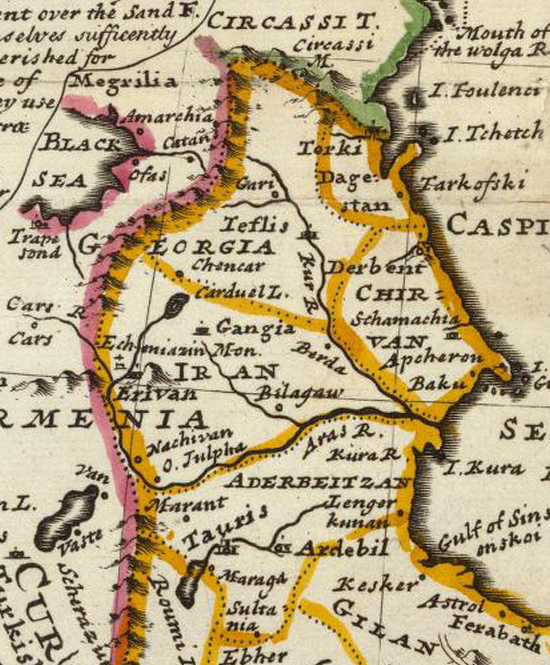
- Northwestern part of Safavid Iran
- Status: Province of Safavid Iran
- Capital: Darband (Derbent)
- Common languages: Persian, Azerbaijani, Lezgin, Avar, Lak, Tabasaran, Tat, Kumyk, Dargin
- Government: Province
- Vali
- History
  - Establishment: 1501
  - Disestablished: 1736
Succeeded by
Afsharid Iran
- Today part of: Russia

The province of Daghestan (Persian: ولایت داغستان, romanized: Velāyat-e Dâghestân) was a province of Safavid Iran, centred on the territory of the present-day Republic of Dagestan (North Caucasus, Russia). Numerous high-ranking Safavid figures originally hailed from the province, or had roots there.

== History ==
Safavid control could roughly be divided into two areas. The areas in southernmost Daghestan, amongst which Darband (Derbent), were governed by officials who directly hailed from the Safavid ranks. The areas more to the north and west, where various Daghestani principalities and feudal territories existed, were governed by various local dynasts under Safavid suzerainty. The most important of these were the Shamkhal of Kumukh at the Terek River, and the ruler of the Kara Qaytaq styled with the hereditary title of Utsmi, located on the Caspian littoral. (Note: The "Kara Qaytaq" is sometimes also simply referred to as "Qaytaq".) The small kingdom of Enderi, located south of the Terek, formed somewhat of a "buffer state" towards the north. In contemporary sources, its population was commonly referred to as "Lezgis".

The Safavid king (shah) appointed the Shamkhal himself, but the candidate always had to be from the local princes. According to Engelbert Kaempfer, the Shamkhal also possessed the title of vali (i.e. viceroy), but "only as a honorific". Fath-Ali Khan Daghestani, a member of the family of the Shamkhal of Kumukh, rose to become one of the most powerful individuals in the Safavid state.

Though the Shamkhal and the Utsmi attempted at playing the Safavids, Ottomans, and Russians against each other, they were, most of the time, subject rulers of the Safavids. From 1606 till 1719, the Utsmi paid tribute to their Safavid overlords, whereas the Shamkhals did so from 1636 till 1719.

During the Russo-Persian War of 1651-1653, the successful Safavid offensive resulted in the destruction of the Russian fortress on the Iranian side of the Terek and its garrison being expelled. After the issue with the Russians was dealt with, then incumbent Safavid king Abbas II (r. 1642-1666) ordered the "master of the hunt" (mīr shekār-bāshi) Allahverdi Khan to build new fortresses in Daghestan in order to secure the settlement of Qizilbash warriors. However, this led to an atmosphere of uncomfort amongst the Daghestani tribes. Abbas II then tried to bring the Daghestani vassal rulers under the jurisdiction of the Safavid governor of Shirvan, Hajji Manuchehr Khan. When these efforts proved to be unsuccessful, the Safavids sent a 30,000 strong army, which defeated the tribal Daghestani forces. Nevertheless, however, the result was "status quo ante". The Safavid rulers allowed their subject, the Shamkhal, to regain his post as local ruler whereas the Shamkhal sent a son, Gol-Mehr Beg as hostage to the Safavid capital Isfahan.

In 1659, a Safavid army which included 2,000 musketeers (tofangchis), artillery-men (tupchis), their artillery battery (tup-khaneh) led by Aliqoli Beg the tupchi-bashi-ye jolo, was dispatched to the Daghestan province. (Note: The tupchi-bashi-ye jolo in this context refers to the local tupchi-bashi, who was always subordinate to the supreme tupchi-bashi.) In 1668, the province was attacked by the Cossack Stenka Razin and his men.

By the late 1710s, Safavid Iran was in a state of heavy decline, with high-profile issues on its border regions. Amongst these, was the issue related to the Shamkhal of Tarki. For years, the Safavids had not paid his customary subsidy. When the Shamkhal of Tarki then requested government troops against Russian aggression, the Safavid king promised him "a token sum of 1,000 tomans". As a result of this negligence, the Shamkhal of Tarki submitted to Russian authority in 1717, facilitating the Russian invasion of Iran of several years later. In 1719, the Utsmi of the Kara Qaytaq and the Shamkhal rebelled against the Safavid overlordship. In the same year the Lezgis were already considered a threat to the northwestern regions. The Safavid government then decided to send the Safavid commander-in-chief (sepahsalar) Hosaynqoli Khan (Vakhtang VI) to Daghestan in order to deal with the issue. Assisted by the governors of Kakheti and Shirvan, the commander-in-chief made significant progress in putting a halt to the Lezgins. However, the initially successful counter-campaign was abandoned by the central government at a critical moment in 1721. The order, which came after the fall of grand vizier Fath-Ali Khan Daghestani, was made at the instigation of the eunuch faction within the royal court, who had persuaded the shah that a successful end of the campaign would do the Safavid realm more harm than good. In their view, it would enable Hosaynqoli Khan, the Safavid vali, to form an alliance with Russia with an eye to conquering Iran. With the threat then left unchecked, Shamakhi, the capital of the Shirvan province, was taken by 15,000 Lezgin tribesmen aided by Shamkhal Sorkhay Khan, its Shia population massacred, and the city ransacked.

In 1722, the Russian Empire capitalized on the eruption of chaos and instability, and annexed the maritime areas of the province, including Derbent, from the Safavids.

After the Safavids were restored in 1729 by Nader Qoli Beg (later known as Nader Shah), Nader also re-established the former's hegemony over the area. In 1735, he concluded the Treaty of Ganja with the Russians, whereby they were forced to give back the territories in Daghestan back that had been taken by Peter the Great in 1722-1723. He also conducted military campaigns in Daghestan which re-subjected the Daghestani tribes, and defeated Shamkhal Sorkhay Khan, who had rebelled earlier against the Safavid hegemony. Another Daghestani chief, Ahmad Khan, sent Nader two of his daughters and his son, as a gesture of submission.

== Sources ==
- Axworthy, Michael (2009). The Sword of Persia: Nader Shah, from Tribal Warrior to Conquering Tyrant. I.B.Tauris. ISBN 978-1845119829.
- Floor, Willem (2001). Safavid Government Institutions. Costa Mesa, California: Mazda Publishers. ISBN 978-1568591353.
- Gammer, Moshe (2005). Muslim Resistance to the Tsar: Shamil and the Conquest of Chechnia and Daghestan. Frank Cass. ISBN 978-1135308988.
- Matthee, Rudolph P. (1999). The Politics of Trade in Safavid Iran: Silk for Silver, 1600-1730. Cambridge: Cambridge University Press. ISBN 978-0521641319.
- Matthee, Rudi (2012). Persia in Crisis: Safavid Decline and the Fall of Isfahan. I.B.Tauris. ISBN 978-1845117450.
- Matthee, Rudi (2012a). "Facing a Rude and Barbarous Neighbor: Iranian Perceptions of Russia and the Russians from the Safavids to the Qajars". In Amanat, Abbas; Vejdani, Farzin (eds.). Iran Facing Others: Identity Boundaries in a Historical Perspective. Palgrave Macmillan. p. 104. ISBN 978-1137013408.
- Savory, Roger (2007). Iran Under the Safavids. Cambridge: Cambridge University Press. ISBN 978-0521042512.
- Tucker, Spencer C., ed. (2010). "Overview of 1700-1750: Chronology". A Global Chronology of Conflict: From the Ancient World to the Modern Middle East. ABC-CLIO. ISBN 978-1851096725.
