= Artemy Volynsky =

Russian statesman and diplomat

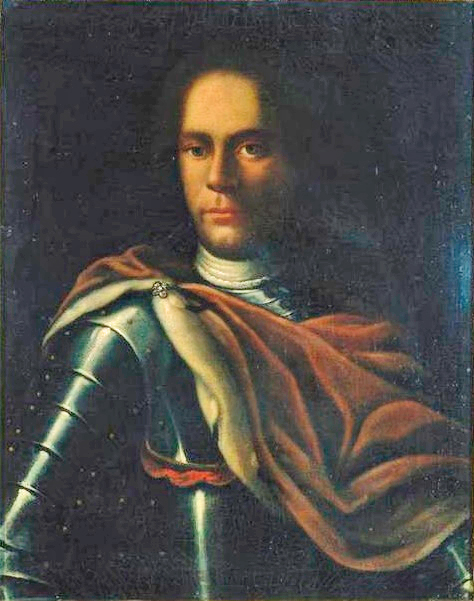
- Artemy Volynsky by Georg Gsell, between 1717 and 1740

Russian ambassador to Safavid Iran
- In office 1715–1719
- Appointed by: Peter the Great
- Succeeded by: Semyon Avramov

Governor of Kazan
- In office 1728–1730
- Appointed by: Catherine I
- Monarch: Peter II

Personal details
- Born: 1689
- Died: 27 June 1740 (aged 50–51)
- Known for: Russo-Iranian treaty of 1717

Military service
- Allegiance: Tsardom of Russia (1704–1711); Russian Empire (1730–1736)
- Branch/service: Army of the Tsardom of Russia; Imperial Russian Army
- Years of service: 1704–1736
- Rank: Captain
- Unit: Dragoon
- Battles/wars: Pruth River Campaign

Artemy Petrovich Volynsky (Russian: Арте́мий Петро́вич Волы́нский; 1689–1740) was a Russian statesman and diplomat. His career started as a soldier but was rapidly upgraded to ambassador to Safavid Iran, and later as Governor of Astrakhan during the reign of Peter the Great (r. 1682–1725). He was later accused of corruption and stripped of nearly all his powers, before Catherine I of Russia sent him to govern the vast Governorate of Kazan. Anna of Russia appointed Volynsky one of her three chief ministers in 1738. After beating the noted poet Vasily Trediakovsky, Volynsky was arrested on charges of conspiracy and misconduct. Volynsky's archenemy Ernst Johann von Biron had him sentenced to death and beheaded on 27 June 1740.

== Military youth ==
Artemy Volynsky was a male-line descendant of Prince Bobrok and thus the Lithuanian Gediminid dynasty. His father was one of the dignitaries at the court of Feodor III, and also a voivod in Kazan. He entered a dragoon regiment in 1704 and rose to the rank of captain, by 1711; then, exchanging the military service for diplomacy, he was attached to the suite of Vice-Chancellor Peter Shafirov. He was present during the Pruth Campaign and shared Shafirov's captivity in the Seven Towers in Constantinople.

== Minister for Peter the Great ==
In 1715, by orders of Peter the Great he was sent to Isfahan, Persia, (which he reached in March 1717) as the new Russian ambassador. During his travels he was supposed to redirect the silk trade route in Persia to Russia with the Armenians' help. During his stay in Isfahan, Volynsky signed the Russo-Iranian treaty of 1717 with Shah Soltan Hoseyn.

In 1718 Peter made him one of his six adjutant generals, and governor of Astrakhan. In this post Volynsky displayed distinguished administrative and financial talents. In 1722, he married Alexandra Naryshkina, Peter's cousin. The same year he was accused of peculation and other offences to the emperor, who caned him severely and deprived him of his plenipotentiary powers, despite his undeniable services in Persia, but for which Peter could never have emerged so triumphantly from the difficult Persian War of 1722–1723.

== Governor of Kazan ==
Catherine I made Volynsky governor of the Kazan Governate for a short time, and he held the same post for two years (1728–1730) under Peter II. But his incurable corruption and unbridled temper so discredited the government that he was deprived of the post shortly after the accession of Anne. From 1730 to 1736 Volynsky served in the army under Munnich. In 1737 he was appointed the second Russian plenipotentiary at the abortive congress of Nemirov held for the conclusion of peace with the Porte.

== Condemned under Anne ==
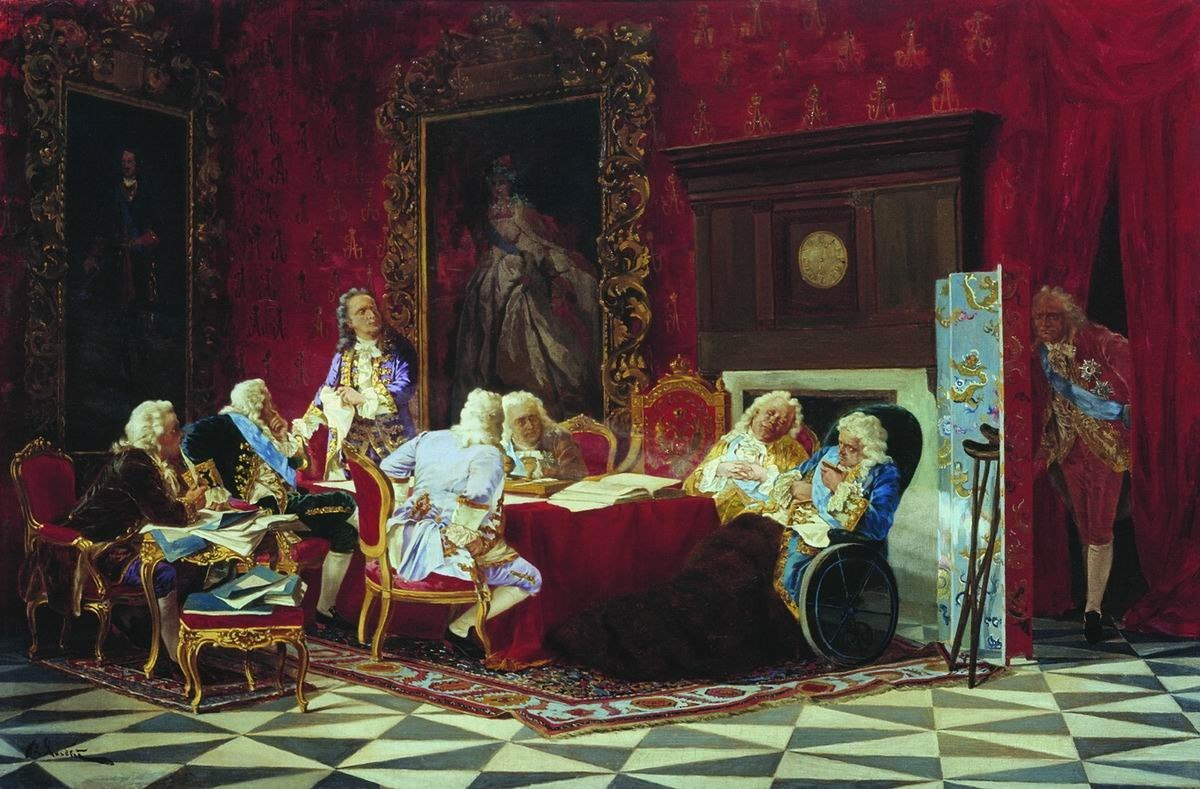
Ministers Cabinet of Empress Anna Ivanovna with Volynsky present. Painting by Valery Jacobi.

In 1738 he was introduced into the Russian cabinet by Biron as a counterpoise against Andrei Osterman. Volynsky, however, now thought himself strong enough to attempt to supersede Biron himself, and openly opposed the favorite in the State Council in the debates as to the indemnity due to Poland for the violations of her territory during the War of the Polish Succession, Biron advising that a liberal indemnity should be given, whereas Volynsky objected to any indemnity at all.

Biron thereupon forced Anne to order an inquiry into Volynsky's past career, with the result that he was tried before a tribunal of Biron's men. The charges faced were that he, as a minister, and Andrey Khrushchyov (1691—1740), as an assistant minister, tried to dethrone Empress Anne for Peter the Great's daughter, Elizabeth. He was arrested on 23 June 1740 and thus condemned to be broken on the wheel and then beheaded. On the scaffold, by the clemency of the empress, his punishment was mitigated to the severing of his right hand followed by decapitation on 27 June 1740. The sentence was executed exactly 31 years after the Battle of Poltava. Volynsky had by his side architect Pyotr Yeropkin and Andrey Khrushchyov.

== Legacy ==
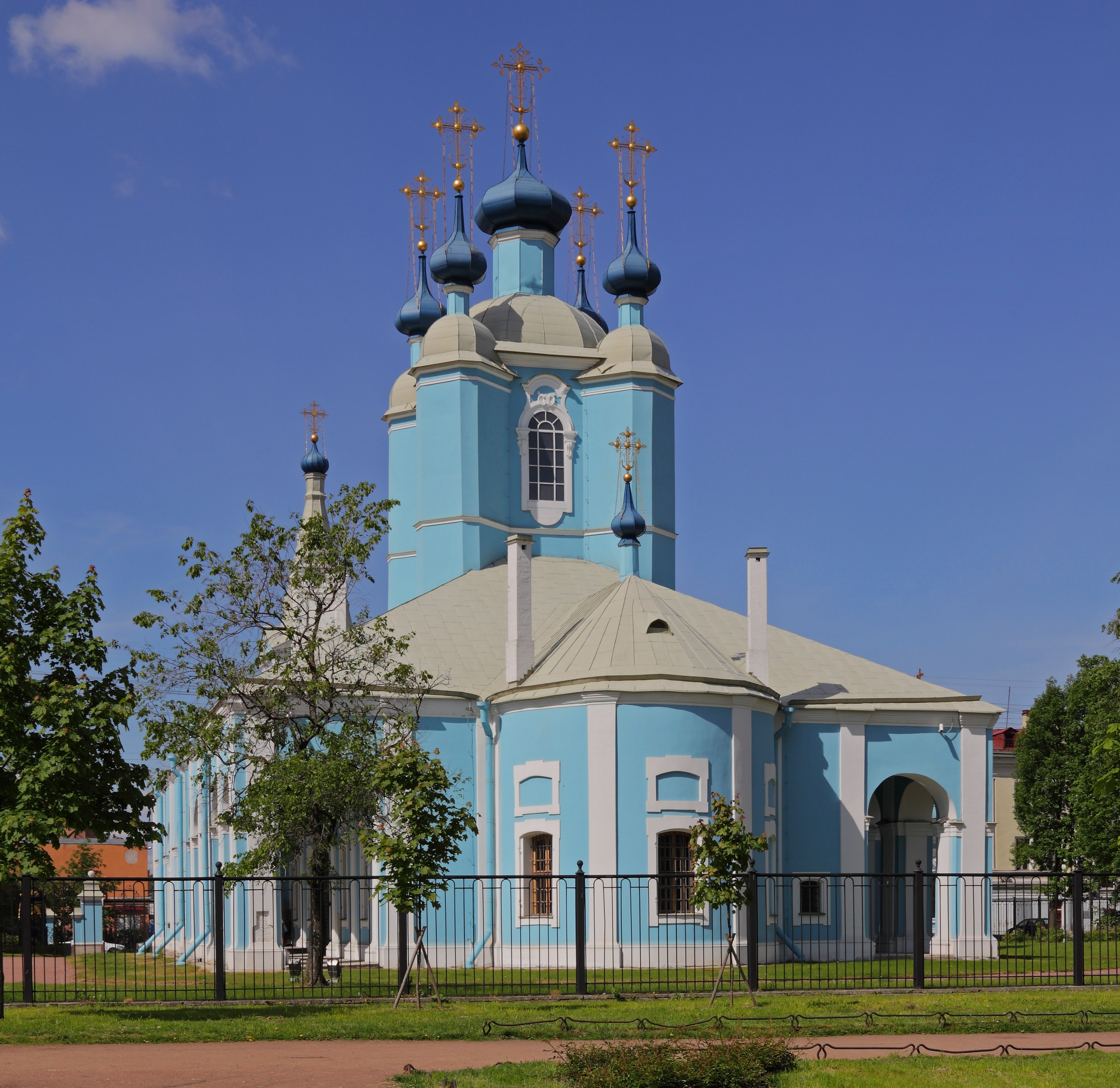
St Sampson's Cathedral, the burial place of Artemy Volynsky

A tombstone in their honour was erected in 1741 by order of Elizabeth of Russia over their burial place beside St. Sampson Cathedral. That was the only thing that was visible over their grave until 1885 when a monument was placed as they were seen as national heroes because they opposed German ideas, as represented by Biron. This point of view would have been quite amazing to their contemporaries and reflects more the concerns of the next century than of Biron's and Volynsky's time.

The charge of conspiracy appears to have been untrue. Volynsky was tortured twice but even under torture he refused to admit to conspiracy, while admitting the ancillary charge of taking bribes (of which no Russian official of the time was innocent). Volynsky's draft of a General Project of Internal Affairs of the State contained many suggestions for reforms of administration but avoided altogether the subject of imperial succession and prerogatives.
