= Osip Dymov (writer) =

Russian writer, playwright, and journalist (1878–1959)

- Осип Дымов; אָסיפּ דימאָוו
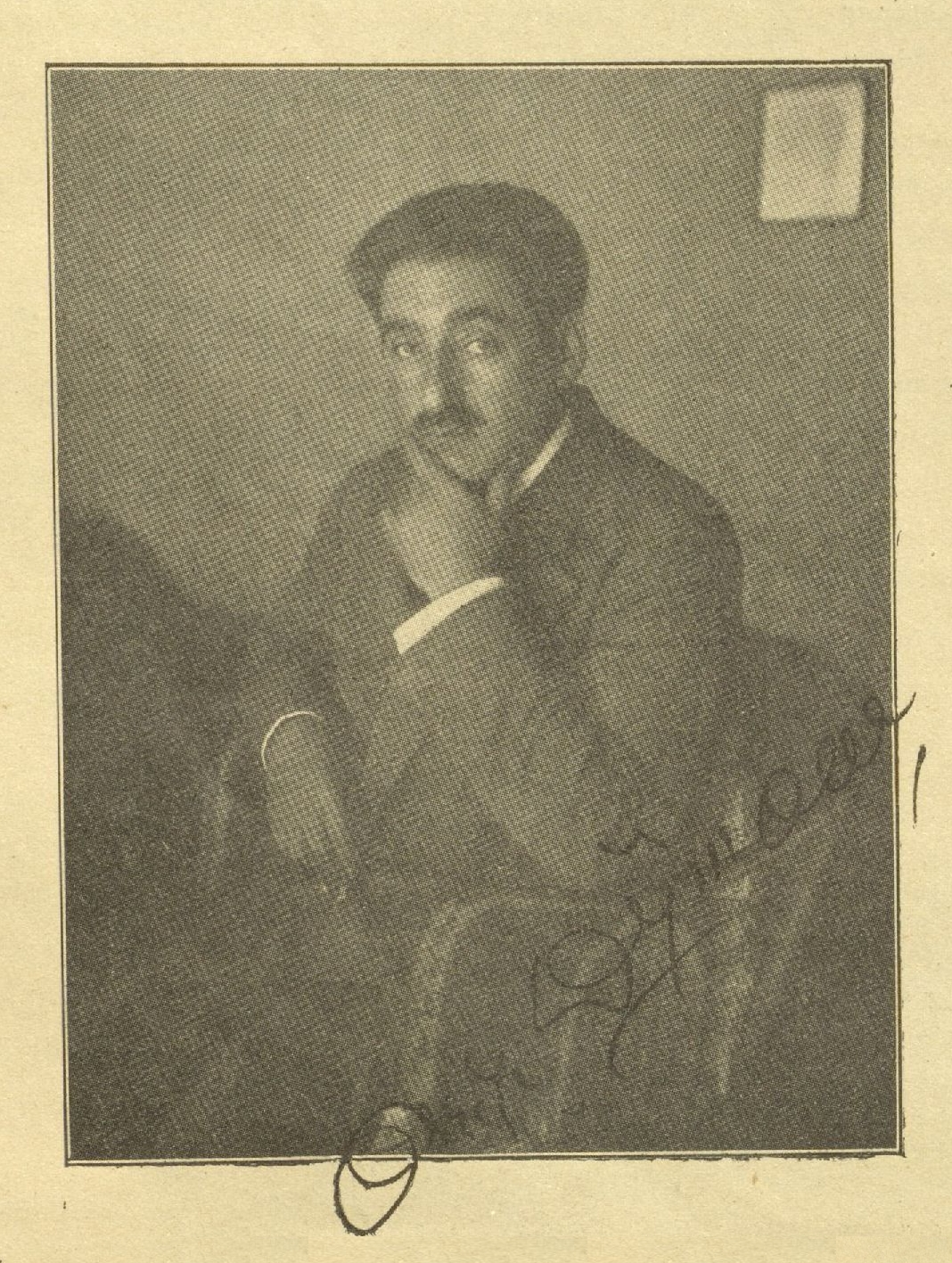
- Born: Osip Isidorovich Perelman; 17 February 1878; Białystok, Grodno Governorate, Russian Empire
- Died: 2 February 1959 (aged 80); Manhattan, New York, US
- Citizenship: American (from 1926)
- Education: Imperial Forestry Institute, 1902
- Spouses: Irene Grune Dymov (died 1924); Anna Dymov (m. 1929)
- Children: 1
- Relatives: Yakov Perelman (brother)
- Writing career
- Pen name: Osip Dymov
- Language: Russian; Yiddish

Osip Isidorovich Perelman (Russian: Осип Исидорович Перельман; 17 February 1878 – 2 February 1959), known by the pseudonym Osip Dymov (Russian: Осип Дымов; Yiddish: אָסיפּ דימאָוו), was a Russian writer, playwright, and journalist of Russian and Yiddish literature.

== Biography ==
Dymov was born Osip Isidorovich Perelman (Note: Also cited Ossip Dymov Perelman and Joseph Perelman.) on 17 February [O.S. 4 February] 1878 in Białystok, Grodno Governorate (present-day Poland). Dymov's father came from Germany, and died when he was quite young. Dymov was the elder brother of the popular-science writer Yakov Perelman. Educated at a Russian-language gymnasium, Dymov larter studied at the Imperial Forestry Institute graduating in 1902.

At the age of 16 he began to publish humorous stories in Russian satiric journals. At that time he took the pen name 'Osip Dymov', from the character in Anton Chekhov's short story "The Grasshopper" (1892), and continued to write under that name throughout his career.

He emigrated to the United States in 1913, at the invitation of Yiddish actor and theatre director Boris Thomashefsky, and subsequently became known for his contributions to Yiddish theatre. Among his most popular plays are Yoshke Musikant (Yoshke the musician; 1914) and Bronx Express (1919). The latter play had its premiere in 1919 in a Yiddish translation, at the Jewish Art theatre of Jacob Ben-Ami; it was later translated into English and performed at the Astor Theatre on Broadway, in 1922, to mixed reviews. From 1927 to 1932 Dymov lived in Germany.

== Personal life ==
Dymov was first married to Irene Grune Dymow (1886–1924), a physician, with whom he had one daughter. On 6 March 1929, Dmyov married Anna Dymov (born 1894) in Prague.

Dymov became a naturalized US citizen on 15 April 1926. On 2 February 1959 (Note: Also cited as 1950.) Dymov died in Manhattan aged 80.

== See also ==
- List of Russian-language writers
