= Yakov Perelman =

Russian science writer (1882–1942)

Yakov I. Perelman
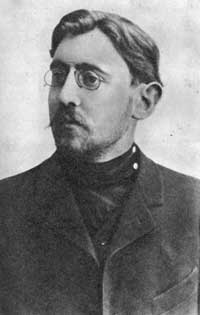
- Yakov Perelman around 1910.
- Born: Solomon-Yakov Isidorovich Perelman; December 4, 1882; Belostok, Grodno Governorate, Russian Empire
- Died: March 16, 1942 (aged 59); Leningrad, Russian SFSR, Soviet Union

Yakov Isidorovich Perelman (Russian: Яков Исидорович Перельман; 4 December [O.S. 22 November] 1882 – 16 March 1942) was a Russian and Soviet science writer and author of many popular science books, including Physics Can Be Fun and Mathematics Can Be Fun (both translated from Russian into English).

== Life and work ==
Perelman was born in 1882 in the town of Białystok, Russian Empire. He obtained the Diploma in Forestry from the Imperial Forestry Institute (Now Saint-Petersburg State Forestry University) in Saint Petersburg, in 1909. He was influenced by Ernst Mach and probably the Russian Machist Alexander Bogdanov in his pedagogical approach to popularising science. After the success of Physics for Entertainment, Perelman set out to produce other books, in which he showed himself to be an imaginative populariser of science. Especially popular were Arithmetic for entertainment, Mechanics for entertainment, Geometry for Entertainment, Astronomy for entertainment, Lively Mathematics, Physics Everywhere, and Tricks and Amusements.

His famous books on physics and astronomy were translated into various languages by the erstwhile Soviet Union.

The scientist Konstantin Tsiolkovsky thought highly of Perelman's talents and creative genius, writing of him in the preface of Interplanetary Journeys: "The author has long been known by his popular, witty and quite scientific works on physics, astronomy and mathematics, which are, moreover written in a marvelous language and are very readable."

Perelman has also authored a number of textbooks and articles in Soviet popular science magazines.

In addition to his educational and scientific writings, he also worked as an editor of science magazines, including Nature and People and In the Workshop of Nature.

Perelman died from starvation in 1942, during the German Siege of Leningrad. The siege started on 9 September 1941 and lasted 872 days, until 27 January 1944. The Siege of Leningrad was one of the longest, most destructive sieges of a major city in modern history and one of the costliest in terms of casualties (1,117,000).

His older brother Yosif was a writer who published under the pseudonym Osip Dymov. He is not related to the Russian mathematician Grigori Perelman, who was born in 1966 to a different Yakov Perelman. However, Grigori Perelman told The New Yorker that his father gave him Physics for Entertainment, and it inspired his interest in mathematics.

== Books ==
- Mathematics can be Fun
- Astronomia Recreativa
- Physics for Entertainment (1913)
- Figures for Fun
- Algebra can be Fun
- Fun with Maths & Physics
- Arithmetic for entertainment
- Mechanics for entertainment
- Geometry for Entertainment
- Astronomy for entertainment
- Lively Mathematics
- Physics Everywhere
- Tricks and Amusements
- Physics Can Be Fun

He has also written several books on interplanetary travel (Interplanetary Journeys, On a Rocket to Stars, and World Expanses)

== Physics for Entertainment ==
In 1913, Russian bookshops began carrying Physics for Entertainment. The educationalist's new book attracted young readers seeking answers to scientific questions.

Physics for Entertainment, 1913

Physics for Entertainment had a unique layout as well as an instructive style. In the preface (11th ed.) Perelman wrote: "The main objective of Physics for Entertainment is to arouse the activity of scientific imagination, to teach the reader to think in the spirit of the science of physics and to create in his mind a wide variety of associations of physical knowledge with the widely differing facts of life, with all that he normally comes into contact with."

In the foreword, Perelman describes the contents as “conundrums, brain-teasers, entertaining anecdotes, and unexpected comparisons,” adding, “I have quoted extensively from Jules Verne, H. G. Wells, Mark Twain and other writers, because, besides providing entertainment, the fantastic experiments these writers describe may well serve as instructive illustrations at physics classes.” The 13th edition (1936) would be the last published during the author's lifetime. Among the book's notable topics was the idea of a perpetual machine: a hypothetical machine which could run incessantly performing useful work. The author discusses perpetual motion, highlighting many attempts to build such a machine, and explains why they failed. Other topics included how to jump from a moving car, and why, “according to the law of buoyancy, we would never drown in the Dead Sea.”

Randall Munroe, the creator of the web comic xkcd and author of his own popular science books, wrote:

The book is a series of a few hundred examples, no more than one or two pages each, asking a question that illustrates some idea in basic physics.

It’s neat to see what has and hasn’t changed in the last century or so. Many of the examples he uses seem to be straight out of a modern high school physics textbook, while others were totally new to me. And some of the answers to the questions he poses seem obvious, but others made me stop and think. [This] diagram ... shows a design for a fountain with no pump — it took me a while to get why it works.... Later in the book, he explains the physics of that drinking bird toy.

It’s written in a fun, engaging, conversational style, as if he’s in the room chatting with you about these neat ideas.

== See also ==
- Perelʼman (crater)
