= Drinking bird =

Novelty toy heat engine

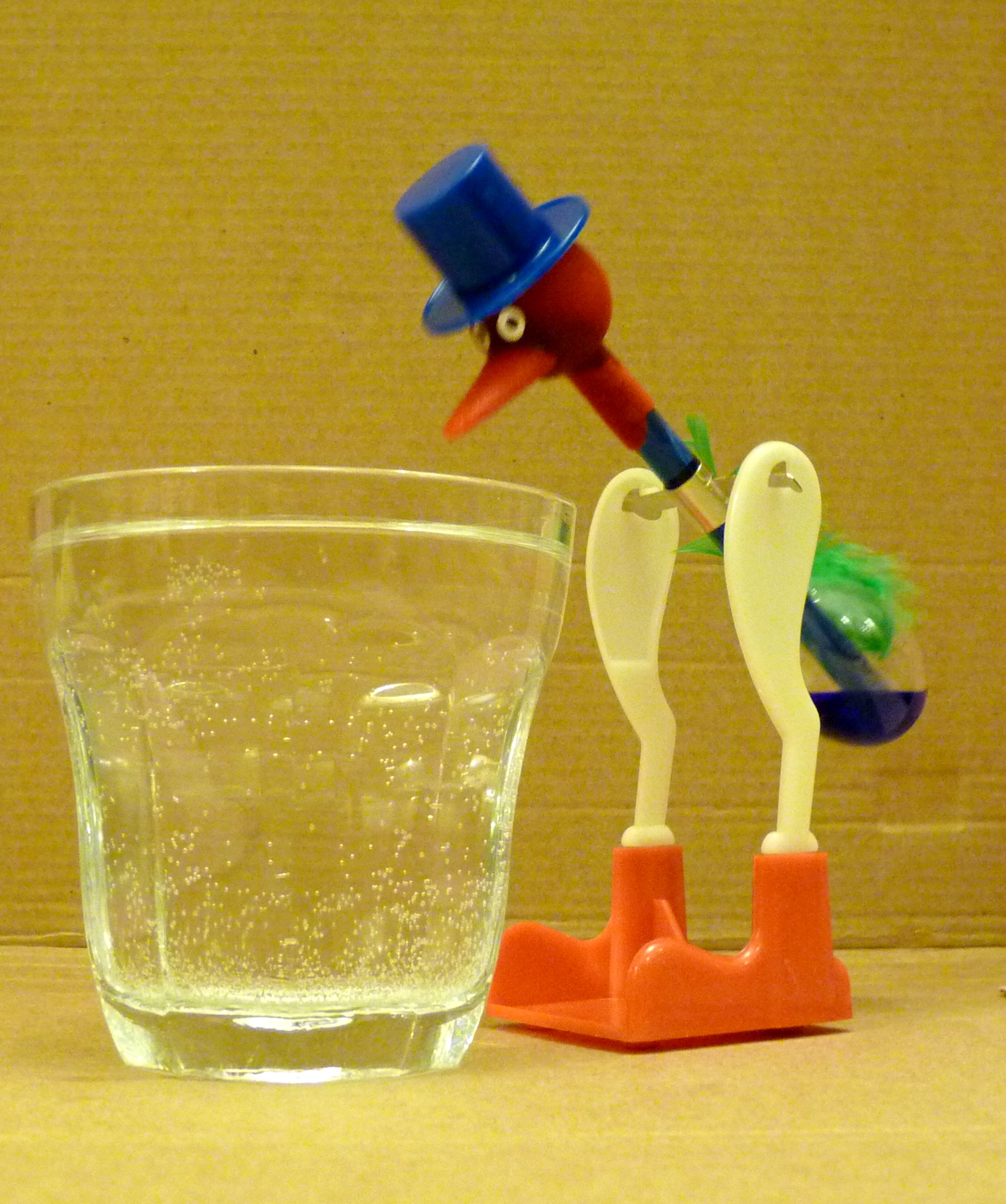
- Drinking bird about to dip its beak in the water
- Classification: Heat engines
- Application: Toy, scientific demonstration
- Fuel source: Heat transfer
- Components: Bulbs, tube, axle, support
- Invented: 1945 / much earlier than 1920

A drinking bird, also known as the dunking bird, drinky bird, water bird, and dipping bird, is a toy heat engine that mimics the motions of a bird drinking from a water source. They are sometimes incorrectly considered examples of a perpetual motion device.

== Construction and materials ==
The space inside the bird contains a fluid, usually colored for visibility. (This dye might fade when exposed to light, with the rate depending on the dye/color). The fluid is typically dichloromethane (DCM), also known as methylene chloride. Earlier versions contained trichlorofluoromethane. Miles V. Sullivan's 1945 patent suggested ether, alcohol, carbon tetrachloride, or chloroform.

Air is removed from the apparatus during manufacture, so the space inside the body is filled by vapor evaporated from the fluid. The upper bulb has a "beak" attached which, along with the head, is covered in a felt-like material.

== Heat engine steps ==
Video of a drinking bird

The process operates as follows:

1. The water evaporates from the felt on the head.
2. Evaporation lowers the temperature of the glass head (heat of vaporization).
3. The temperature decrease causes some of the dichloromethane vapor in the head to condense.
4. The lower temperature and condensation together cause the pressure to drop in the head (governed by equations of state).
5. The higher vapor pressure in the warmer base pushes the liquid up the neck.
6. As the liquid rises, the bird becomes top heavy and tips over.
7. When the bird tips over, the bottom end of the neck tube rises above the surface of the liquid in the bottom bulb.
8. A bubble of warm vapor rises up the tube through this gap, displacing liquid as it goes.
9. Liquid flows back to the bottom bulb (the toy is designed so that when it has tipped over the neck's tilt allows this). Pressure equalizes between top and bottom bulbs.
10. The weight of the liquid in the bottom bulb restores the bird to its vertical position.
11. The liquid in the bottom bulb is heated by ambient air, which is at a temperature slightly higher than the temperature of the bird's head.

== Physical and chemical principles ==
Video "The Engineering of the Drinking Bird" by Bill Hammack

The operation of the bird is also affected by relative humidity.

By using a water-ethanol mixture instead of water, the effect of different rates of evaporation can be demonstrated.

By considering the difference between the wet and dry bulb temperatures, it is possible to develop a mathematical expression to calculate the maximum work that can be produced from a given amount of water "drunk". Such analysis is based on the definition of the Carnot heat engine efficiency and the psychrometric concepts.

== History ==
By the 1760s (or earlier) German artisans had invented a so-called "pulse hammer" (Pulshammer). In 1767 Benjamin Franklin visited Germany, saw a pulse hammer, and in 1768, improved it. Franklin's pulse hammer consisted of two glass bulbs connected by a U-shaped tube; one of the bulbs was partially filled with water in equilibrium with its vapor. Holding the partially filled bulb in one's hand would cause the water to flow into the empty bulb. In 1872, the Italian physicist and engineer Enrico Bernardi combined three Franklin tubes to build a simple heat motor that was powered by evaporation in a way similar to the drinking bird.

In 1881 Israel L. Landis got a patent for a similar oscillating motor. A year later (1882), the Iske brothers got a patent for a similar motor.

A Chinese drinking bird toy dating back to 1910s~1930s named insatiable birdie is described in Yakov Perelman's Physics for Entertainment. The book explained the "insatiable" mechanism: "Since the headtube's temperature becomes lower than that of the tail reservoir, this causes a drop in the pressure of the saturated vapours in the head-tube ..." It was said in Shanghai, China, that when Albert Einstein and his wife, Elsa, arrived in Shanghai in 1922, they were fascinated by the Chinese "insatiable birdie" toy.

In addition, the Japanese professor of toys, Takao Sakai, from Tohoku University, also introduced this Chinese toy.

Arthur M. Hillery got a US patent in 1945. Arthur M. Hillery suggested the use of acetone as working fluid.

It was again patented in the US by Miles V. Sullivan in 1946. He was a Ph.D. inventor-scientist at Bell Labs in Murray Hill, NJ, USA. Robert T. Plate got a US Design patent in 1947, that cites Arthur M. Hillery's patent.

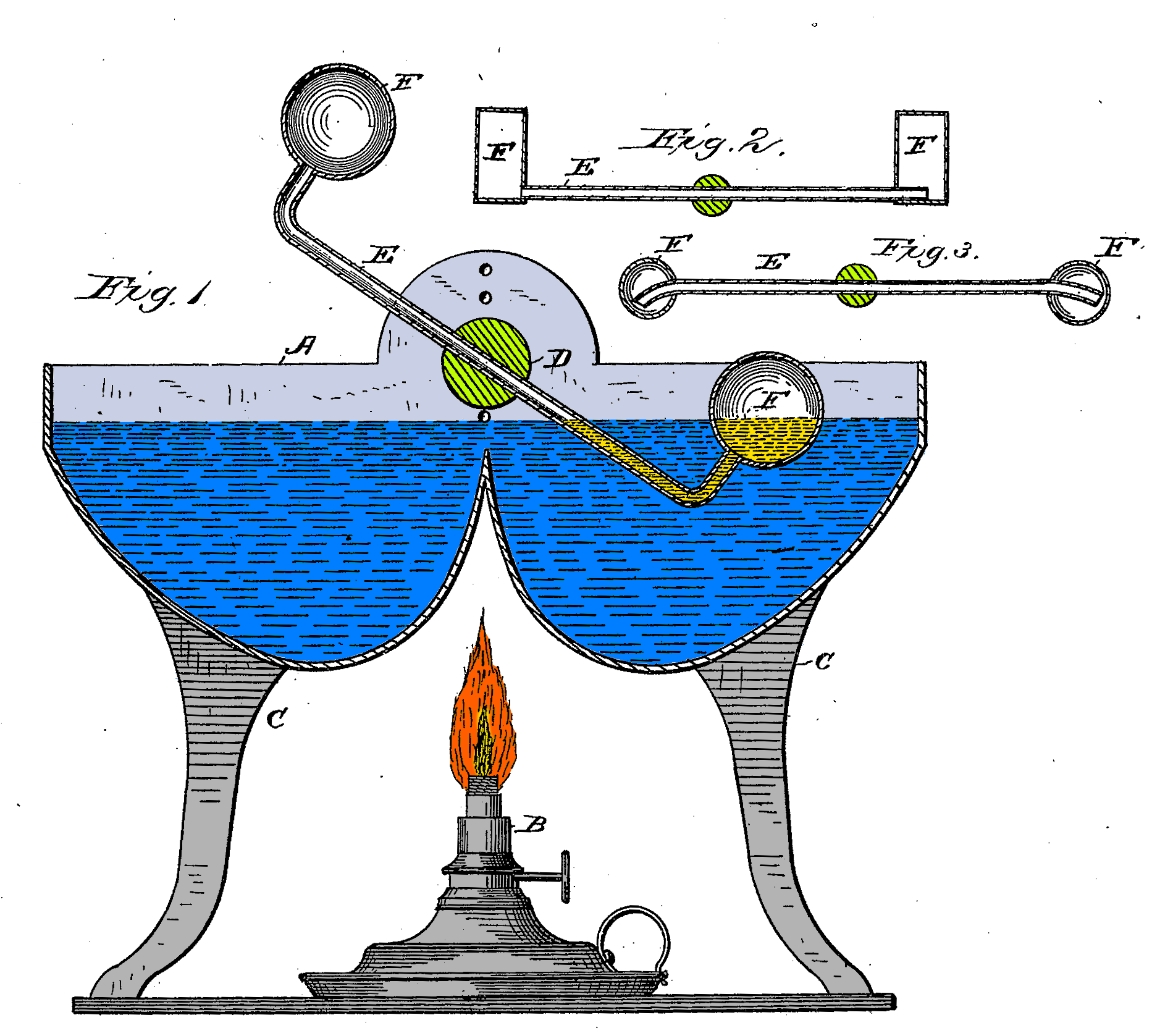
Israel L. Landis 1881

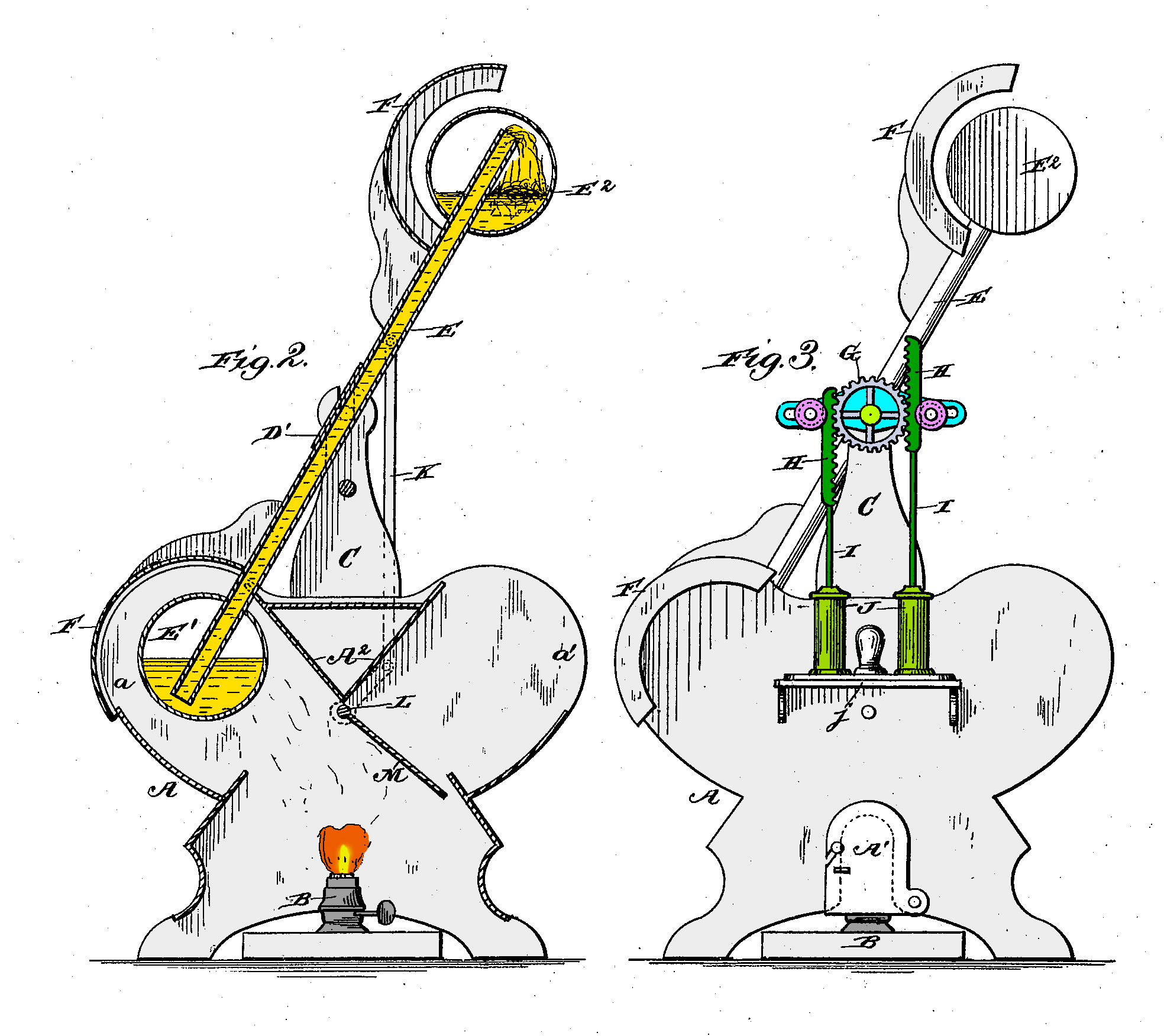
Iske Brothers 1881

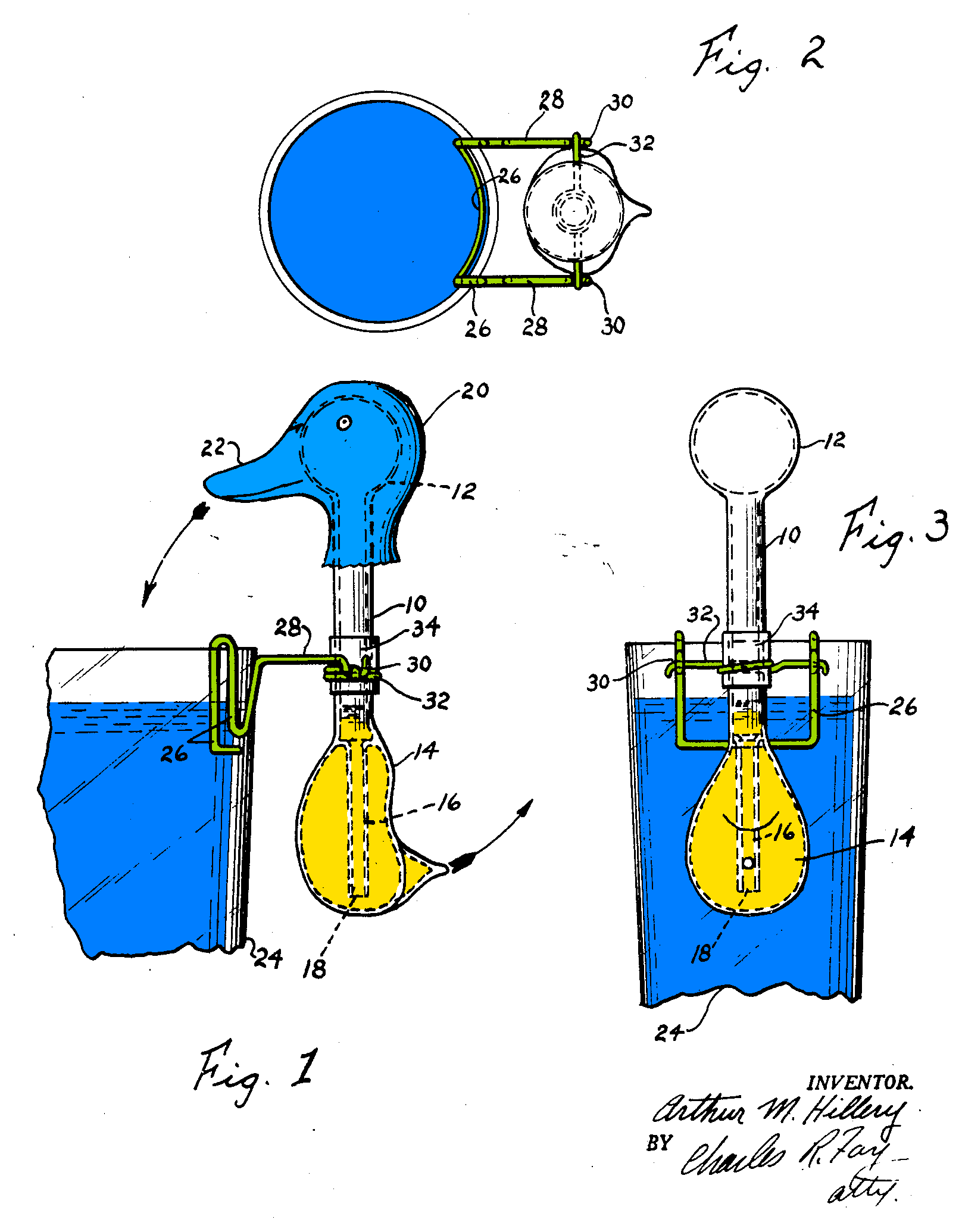
Arthur M. Hillery, 1944

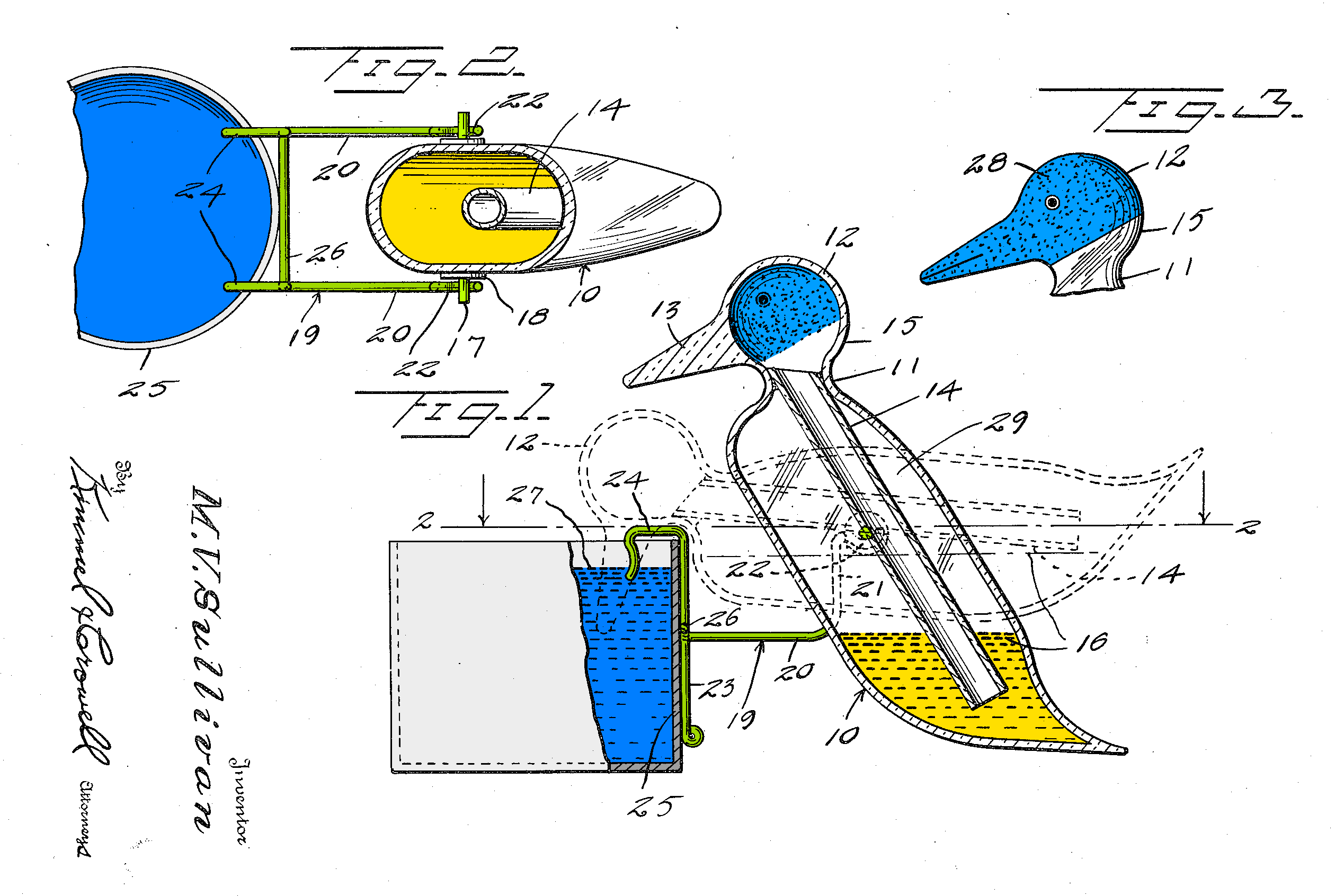
Miles V. Sullivan 1945

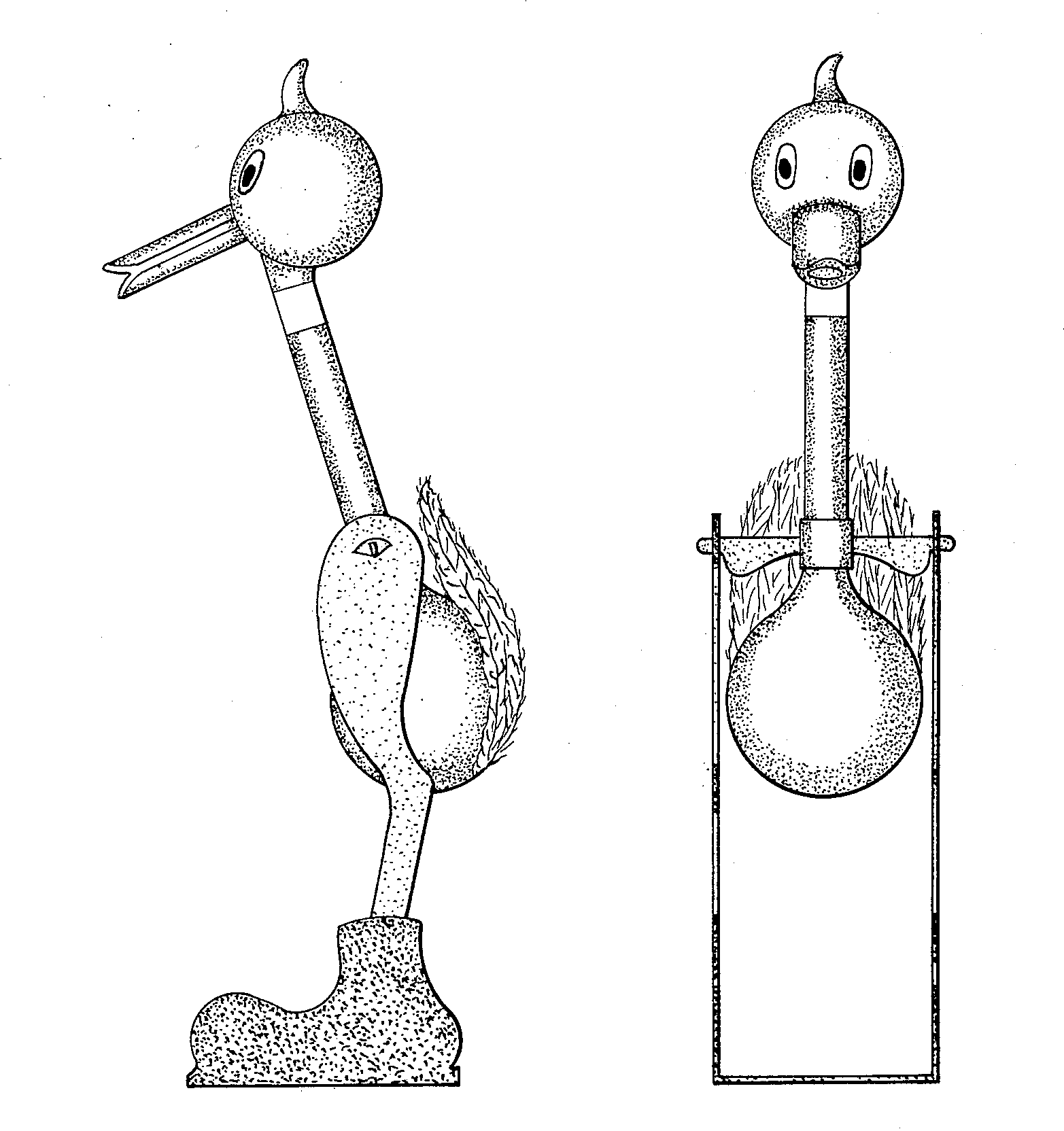
Robert T. Plate 1947

== Alternative design ==
In 2003 an alternative mechanism was devised by Nadine Abraham and Peter Palffy-Muhoray of Ohio, USA, that utilizes capillary action combined with evaporation to produce motion, but has no volatile working fluid. Their paper "A Dunking Bird of the Second Kind", was submitted to the American Journal of Physics, and published in June 2004. It describes a mechanism which, while similar to the original drinking bird, operates without a temperature difference. Instead it utilizes a combination of capillary action, gravitational potential difference and the evaporation of water to power the device.

== In popular culture ==
In Australian playwright John Romeril's play The Floating World, drinking birds are a symbolic prop which represent the progression of Les's insanity.

In The Simpsons episode "King-Size Homer", Homer uses a drinking bird to press the Y key on his nuclear control computer, eventually leading to a nuclear meltdown.

== See also ==
- Cryophorus
- Heat pipe – Heat-transfer device that employs phase transition
- Minto wheel – Model heat engine
- Thermodynamics – Physics of heat, work, and temperature
