= Minto wheel =

Model heat engine

- Minto wheel rotating through heated water
- Classification: Heat engines
- Application: Toy, Scientific demonstration
- Fuel source: Heat transfer
- Components: Bulbs, Tubes, Axle

Minto wheel

The Minto wheel is a heat engine named after Wally Minto. The engine consists of a set of sealed chambers arranged in a circle, with each chamber connected to the chamber opposite it. One chamber in each connected pair is filled with a liquid with a low boiling point (propane (T_{B} = −42 °C) and R-12 (T_{B} = −29.8 °C) are listed in the Mother Earth News articles). Ideally, the working fluid also has a high vapor pressure and density.

== Operation ==
As the lower chamber in each pair is heated, the liquid begins to vaporize, forcing the remaining liquid to travel to the upper chamber. This fluid transfer causes a weight imbalance, which causes the wheel to rotate.

Minto's pamphlet also suggests obtaining a pressure differential with a dissolved gas instead of a boiling gas. Soda water or propane dissolved in kerosene are suggested.

== Characteristics ==
The Minto wheel operates on a small temperature gradient, and produces a large amount of torque, but at very low rotational speed. The speed of rotation is directly proportional to the surface area of the containers used, the volume, and the height of the wheel. The higher the ratio of surface area to volume, the greater the rate of revolution.

== History ==
=== Iske brothers and Israel L. Landis ===
In 1881, the Iske brothers got two patents granted for a design similar to the Minto wheel.

According to the patent, the working fluid is alcohol "or other volatile liquid". Air in the tubes is to be removed and the tubes are sealed (creating a partial vacuum).

The patent suggests lamps as heating sources.

The first patent describes glass for the bulbs and tubes. The second patent does not specify materials, but the construction implies metal. A later patent then clearly specify metal.

US Patent US242454, granted to the Iske brothers

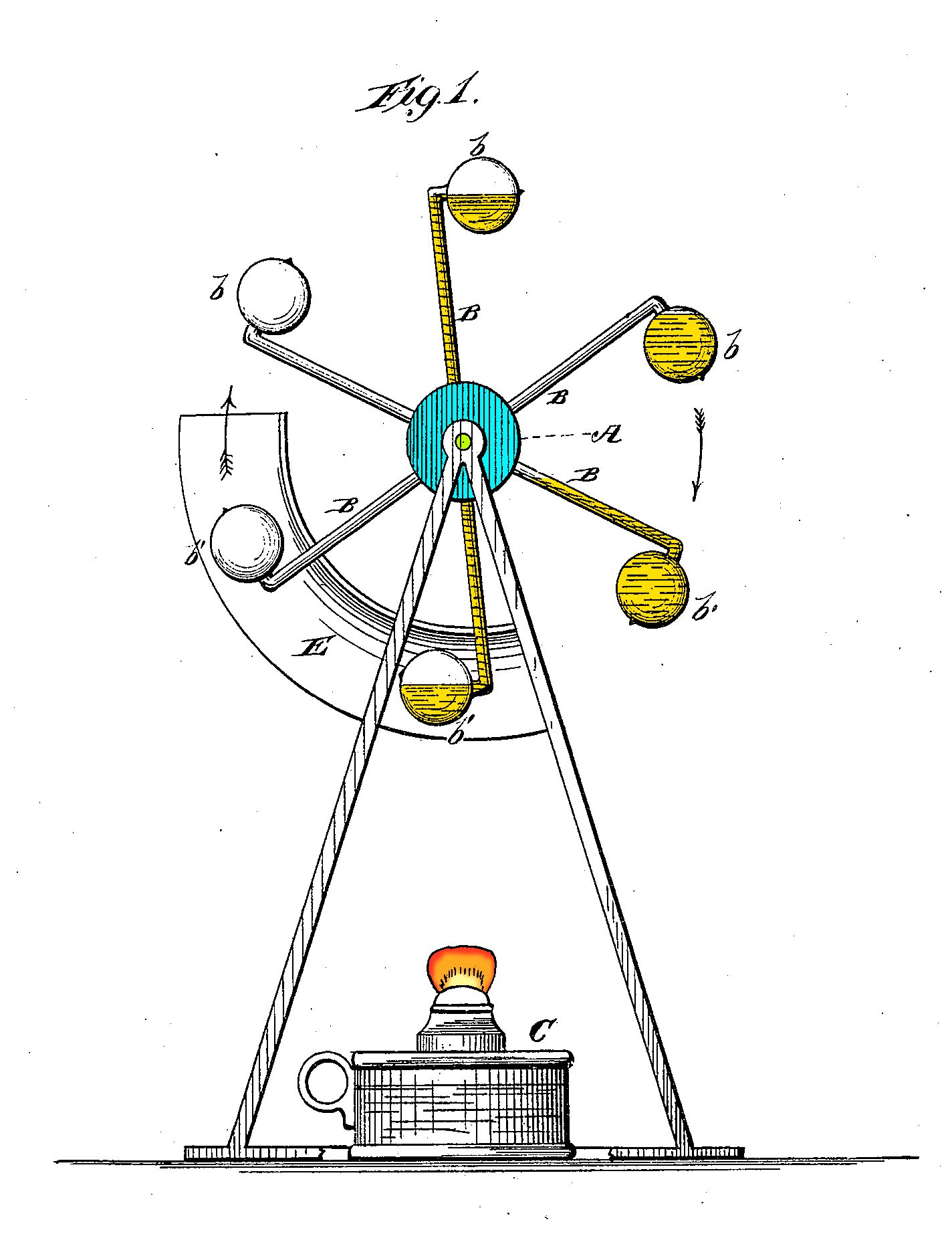
US Patent US243909, granted to the Iske brothers

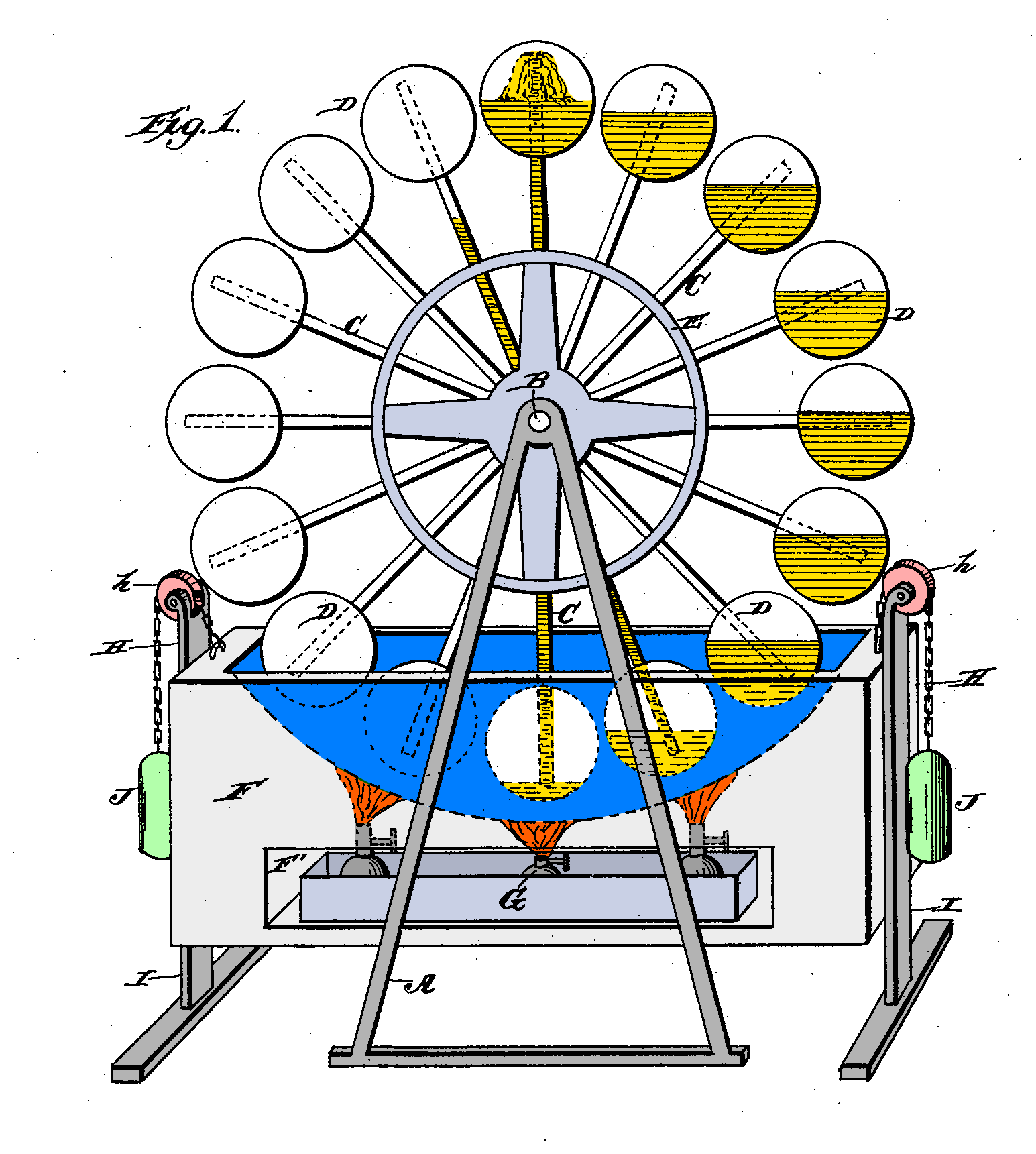
Figure 1

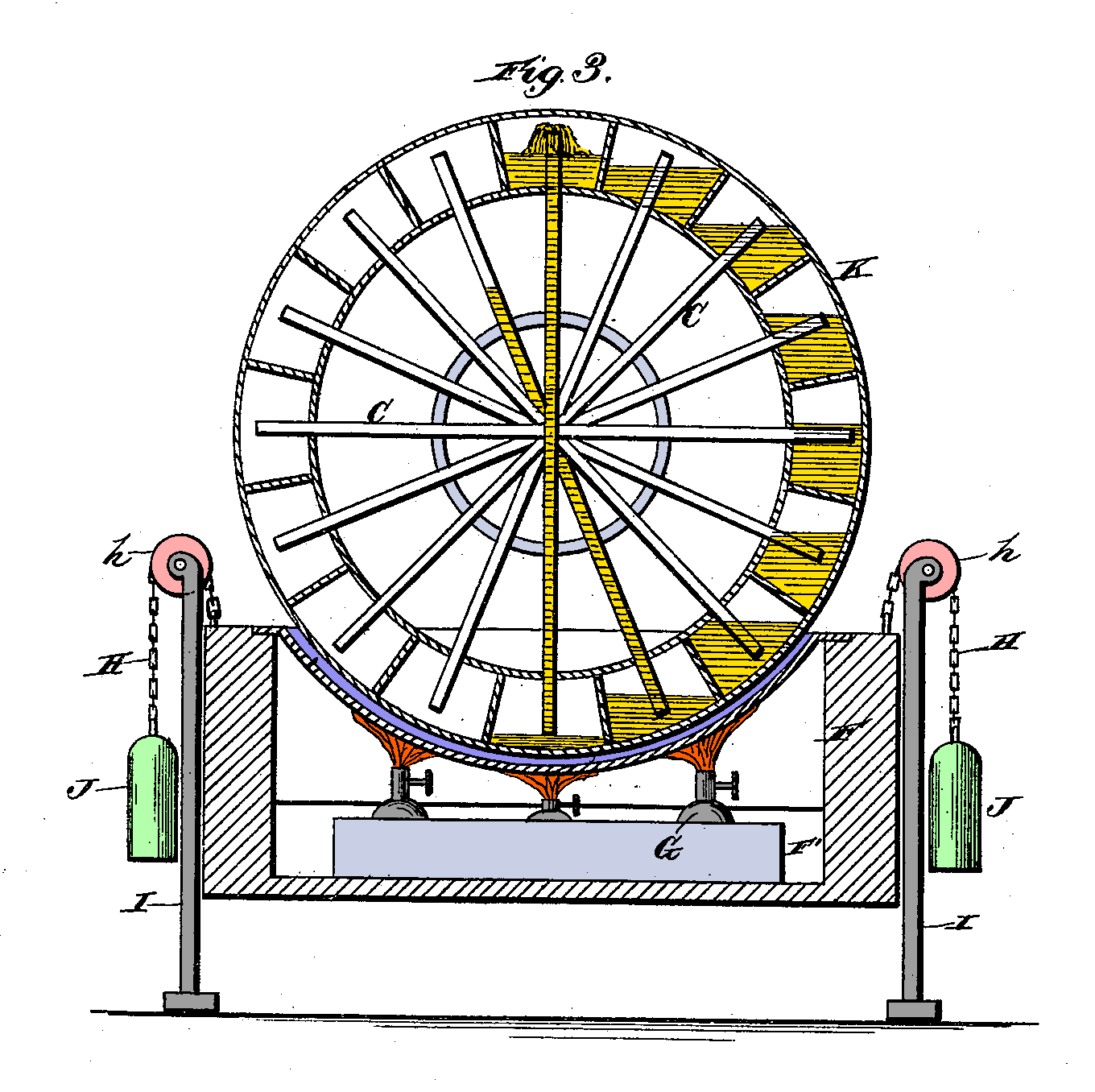
Figure 3

Later the same year, Israel L. Landis got a patent for a similar engine. Different to the Minto wheel and the Iske brothers' patent, the engine was oscillating, not revolving. Landis suggested alcohol or ether as the volatile liquid. Landis suggested heating up the apparatus before removing the air from the bulb/chambers.

US Patent US250821

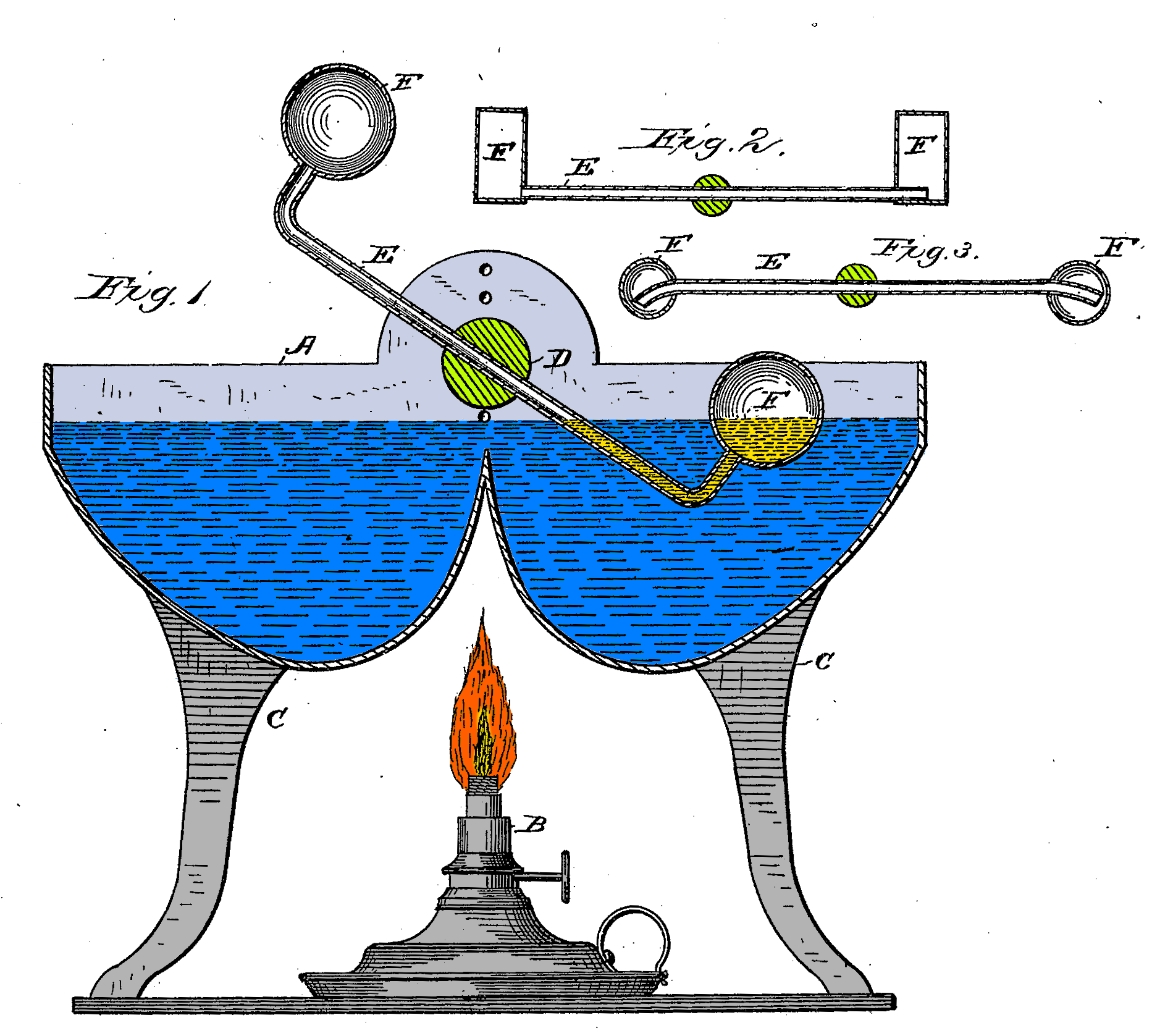
Figure 1

In the following years, the Iske brothers were granted various patents, including some relating to modification and/or improvements on engines similarly to the Minto Wheel and an oscillating engine similarly to Israel L. Landis design.

US Patent 253867 - Variation with Flexible Tubing and Endless Chain

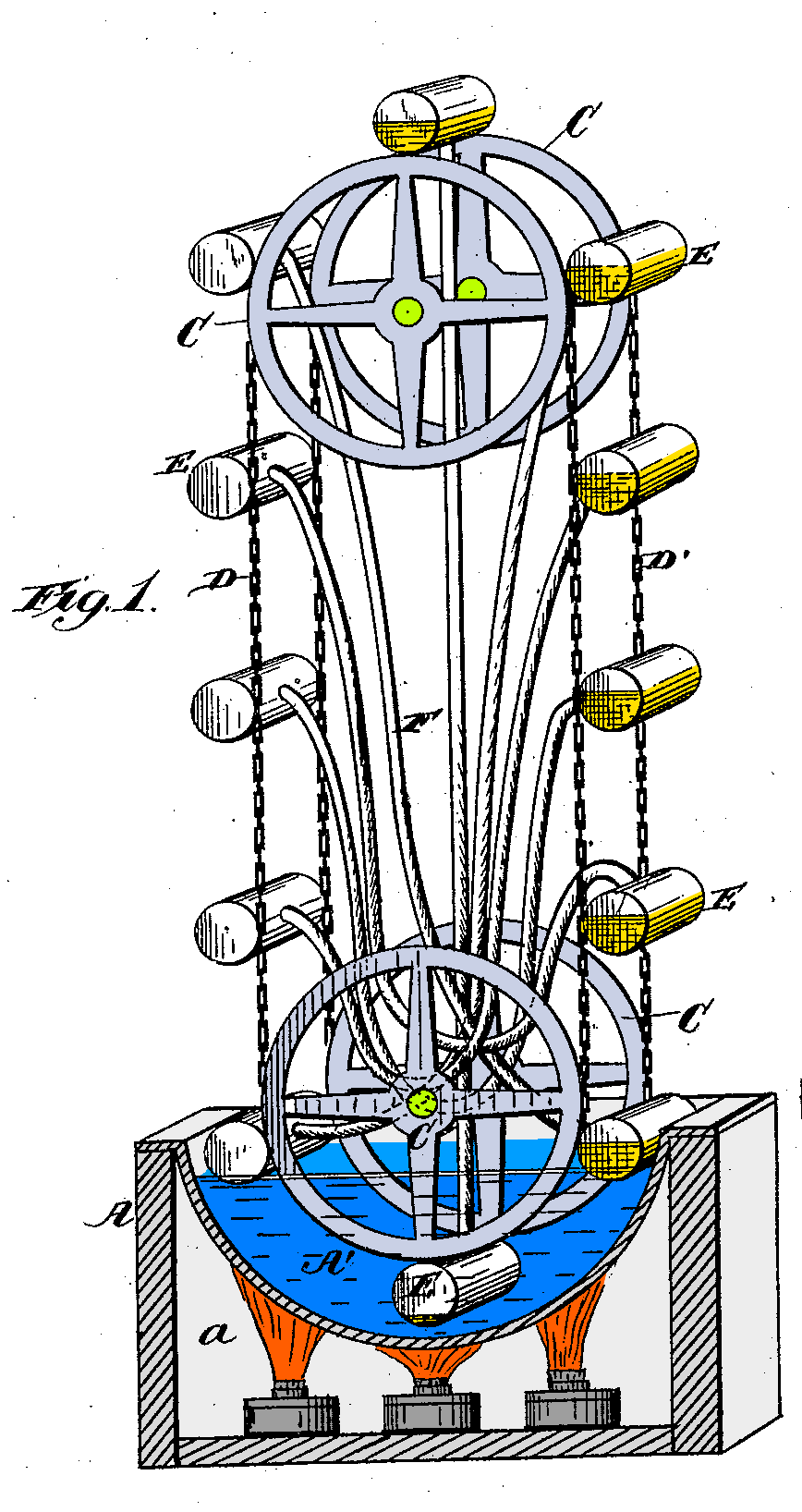
Figure 1 - motor which rotates

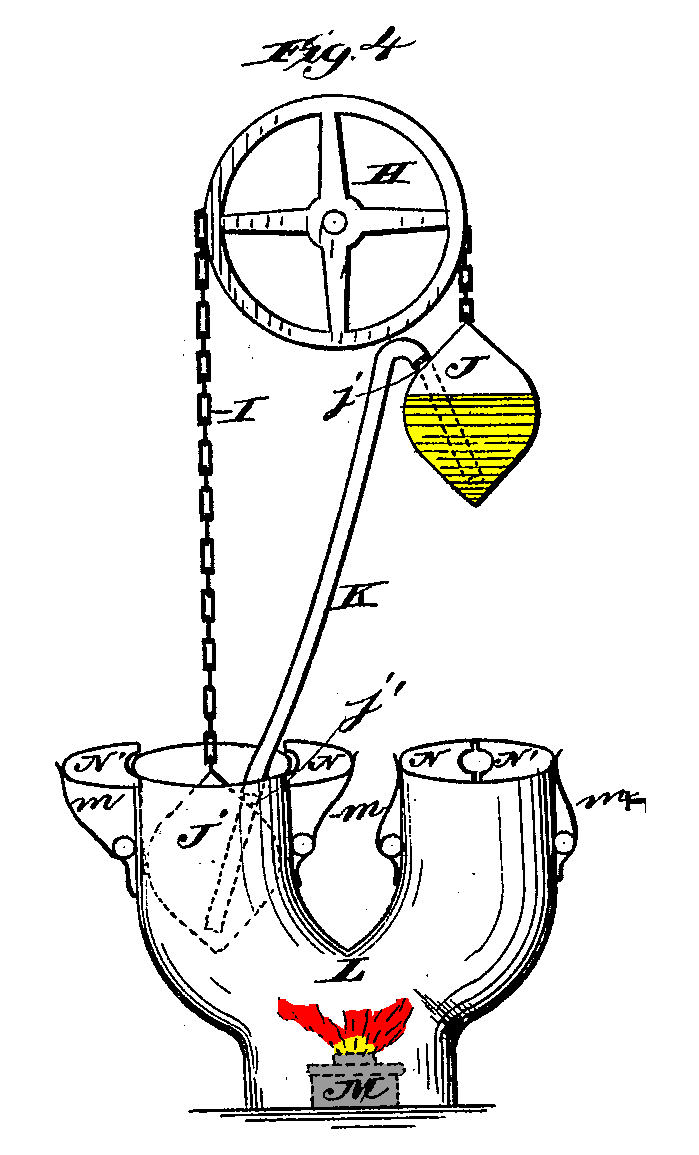
Figure 4 - motor which oscillates
US Patent 253868

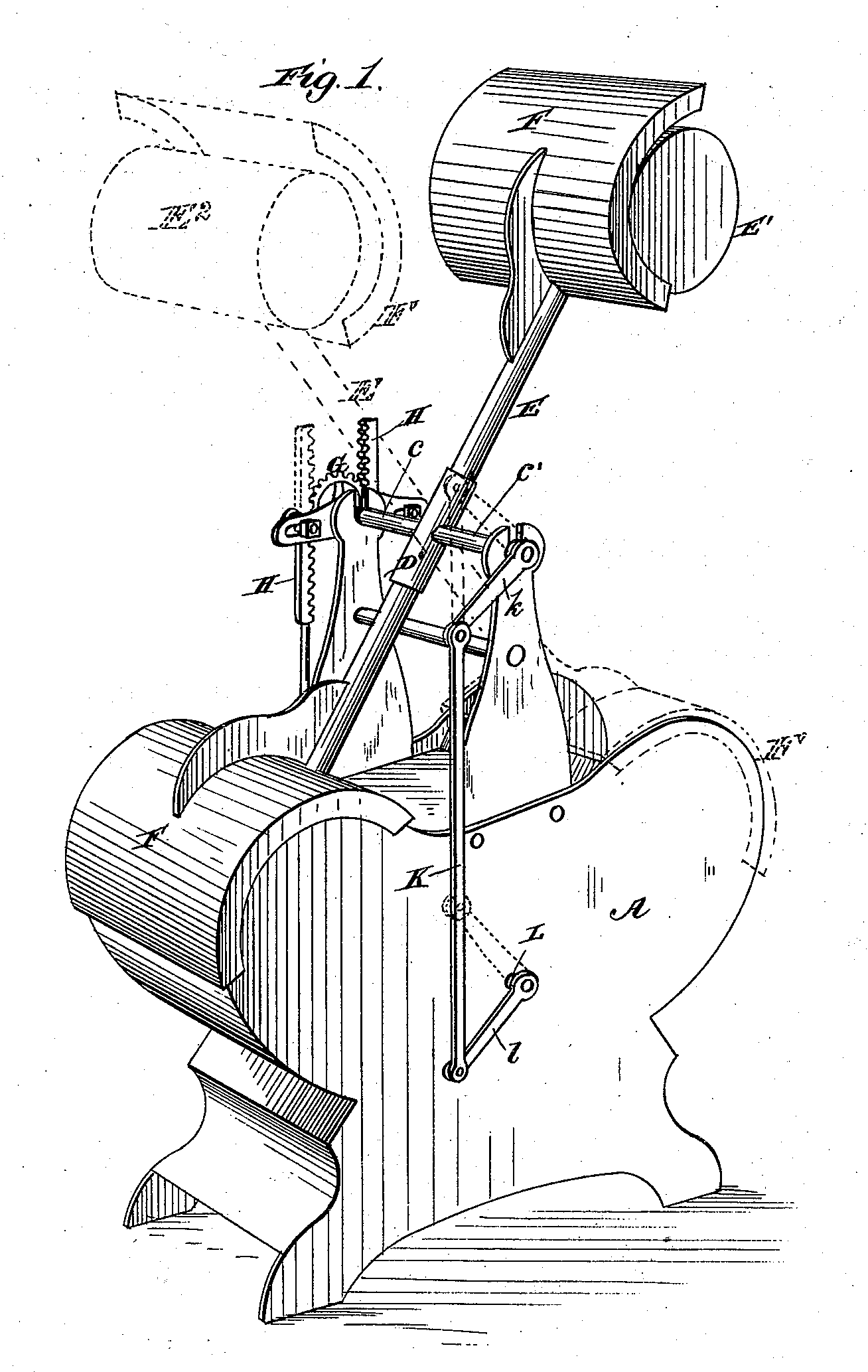
Figure 1

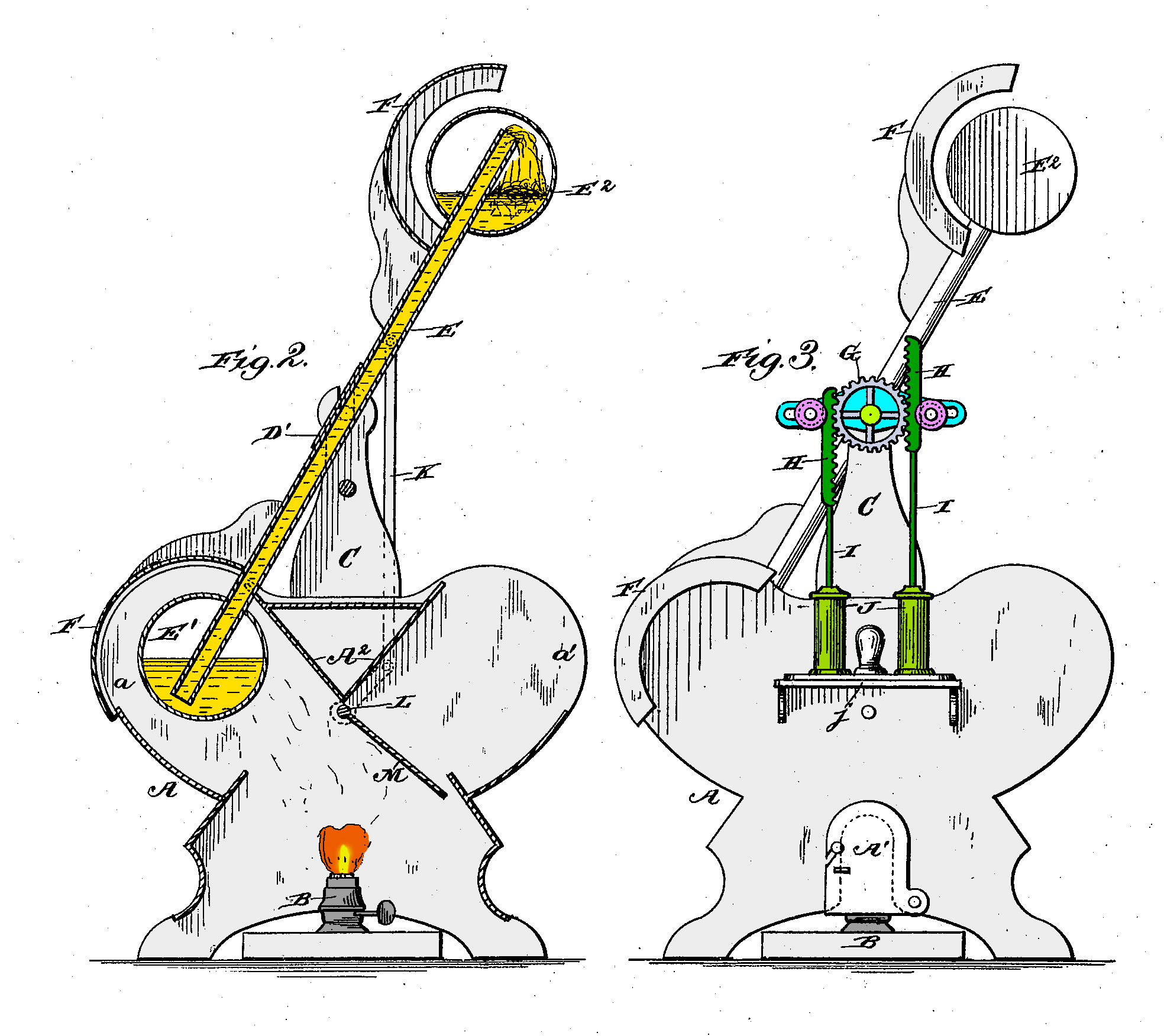
Figure 2 and 3
US Patent 271639

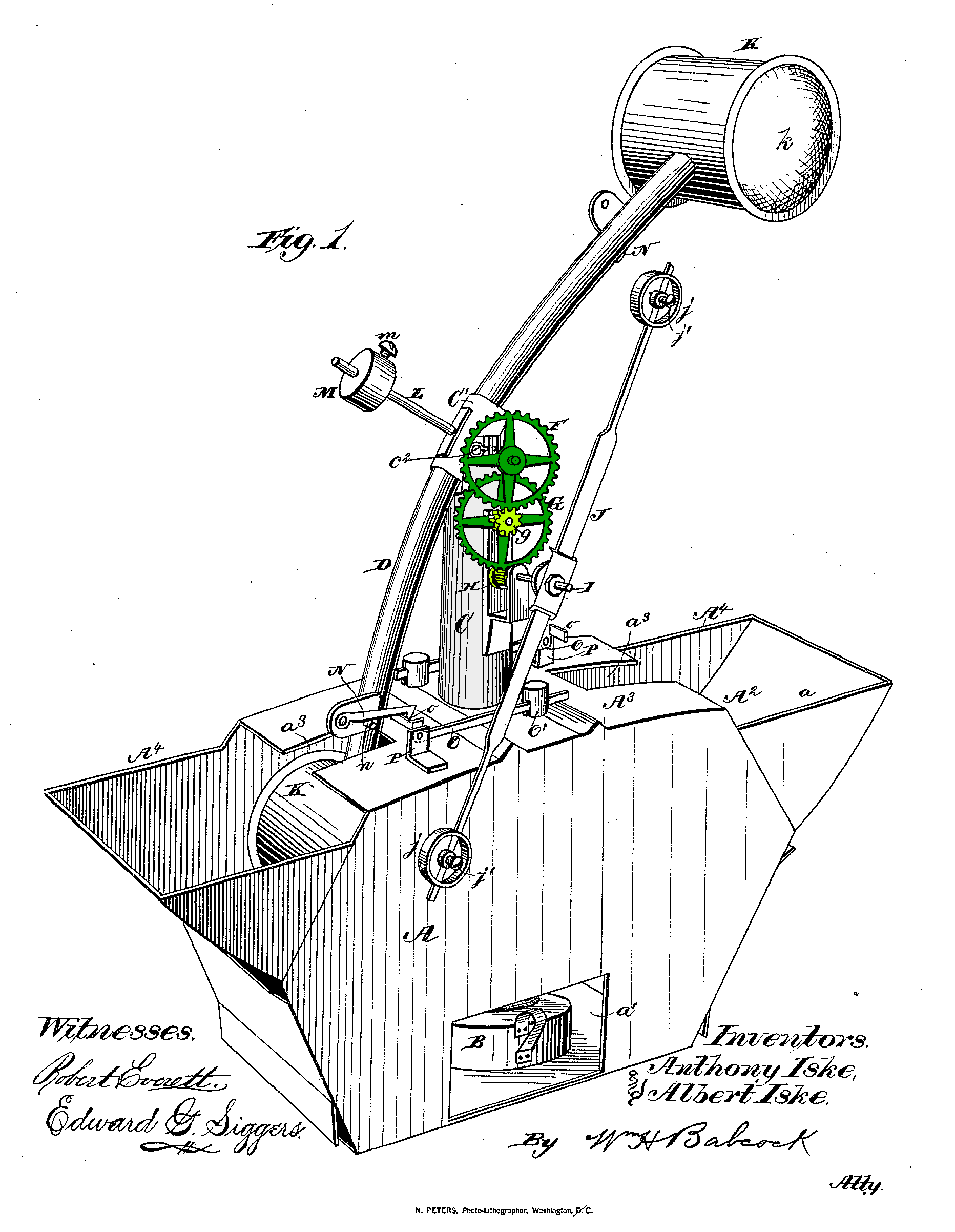
Figure 1

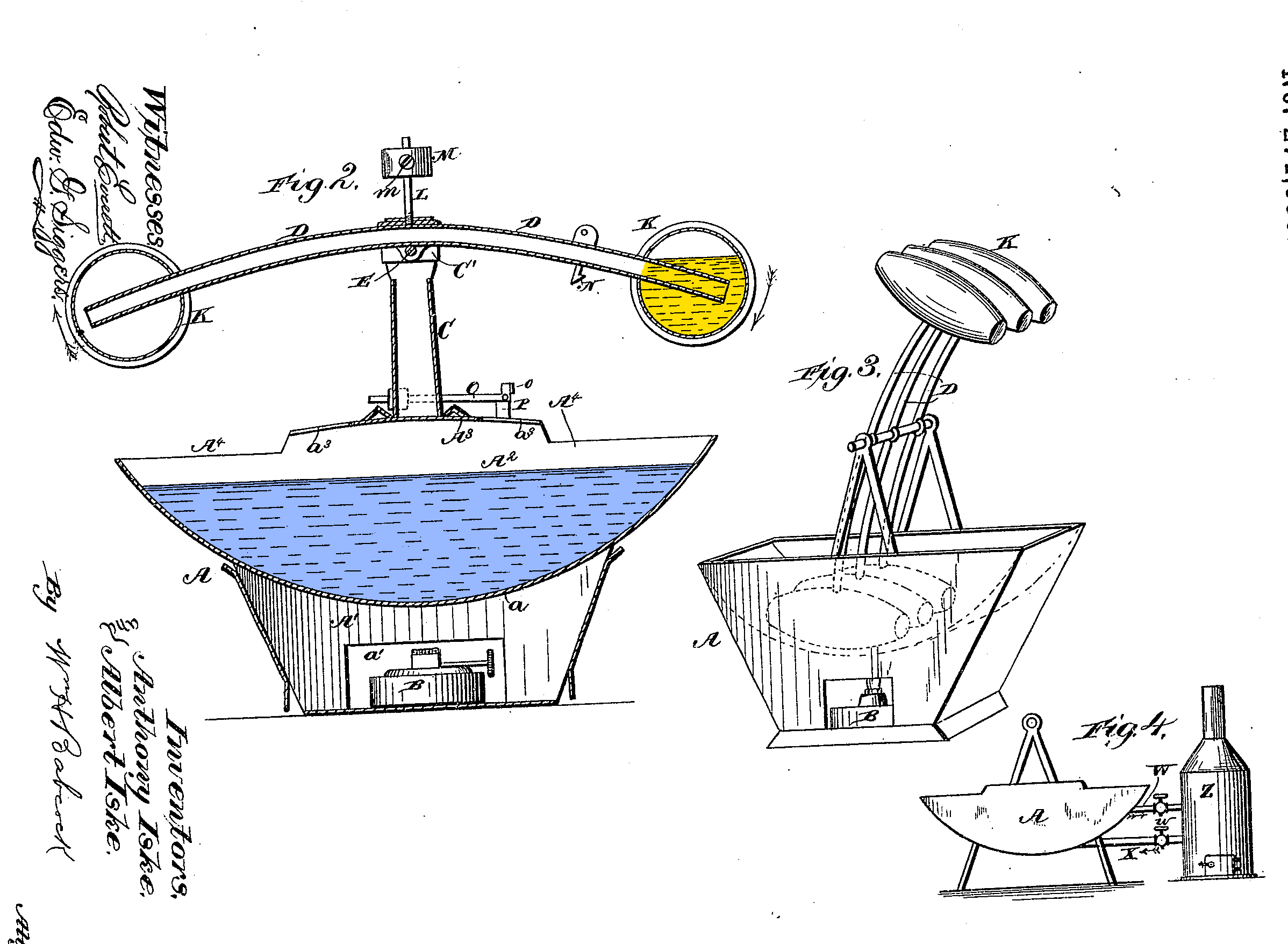
Figure 2 and 3

=== Drinking bird ===
The oscillating types by the Iske Brothers and Landis are related to the drinking bird toy.

The drinking bird is dating back to 1910s~1930s. The drinking bird was patented in the US in 1945 and 1946 by two different inventors.

drinking bird US patents

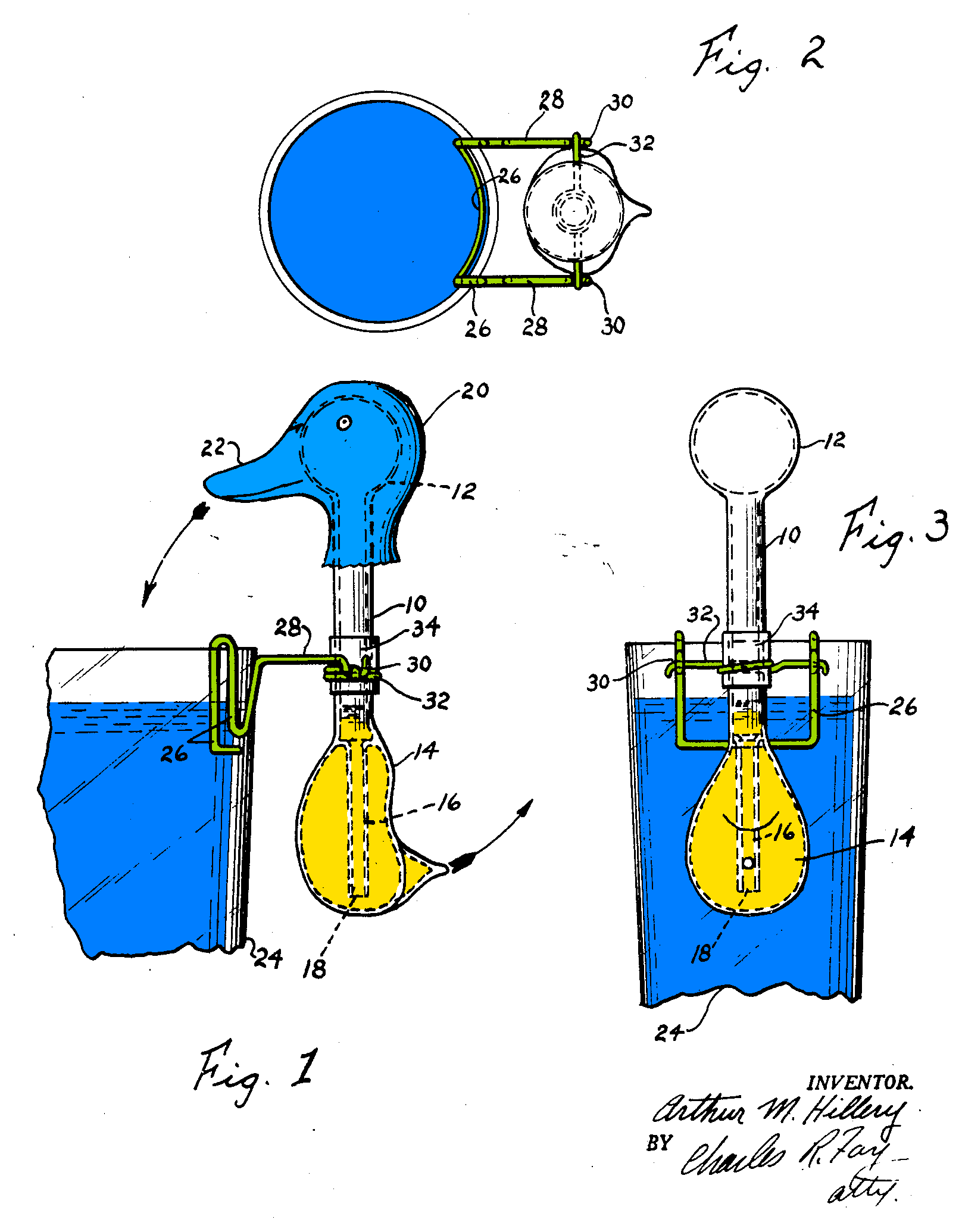
Arthur M. Hillery, 1944

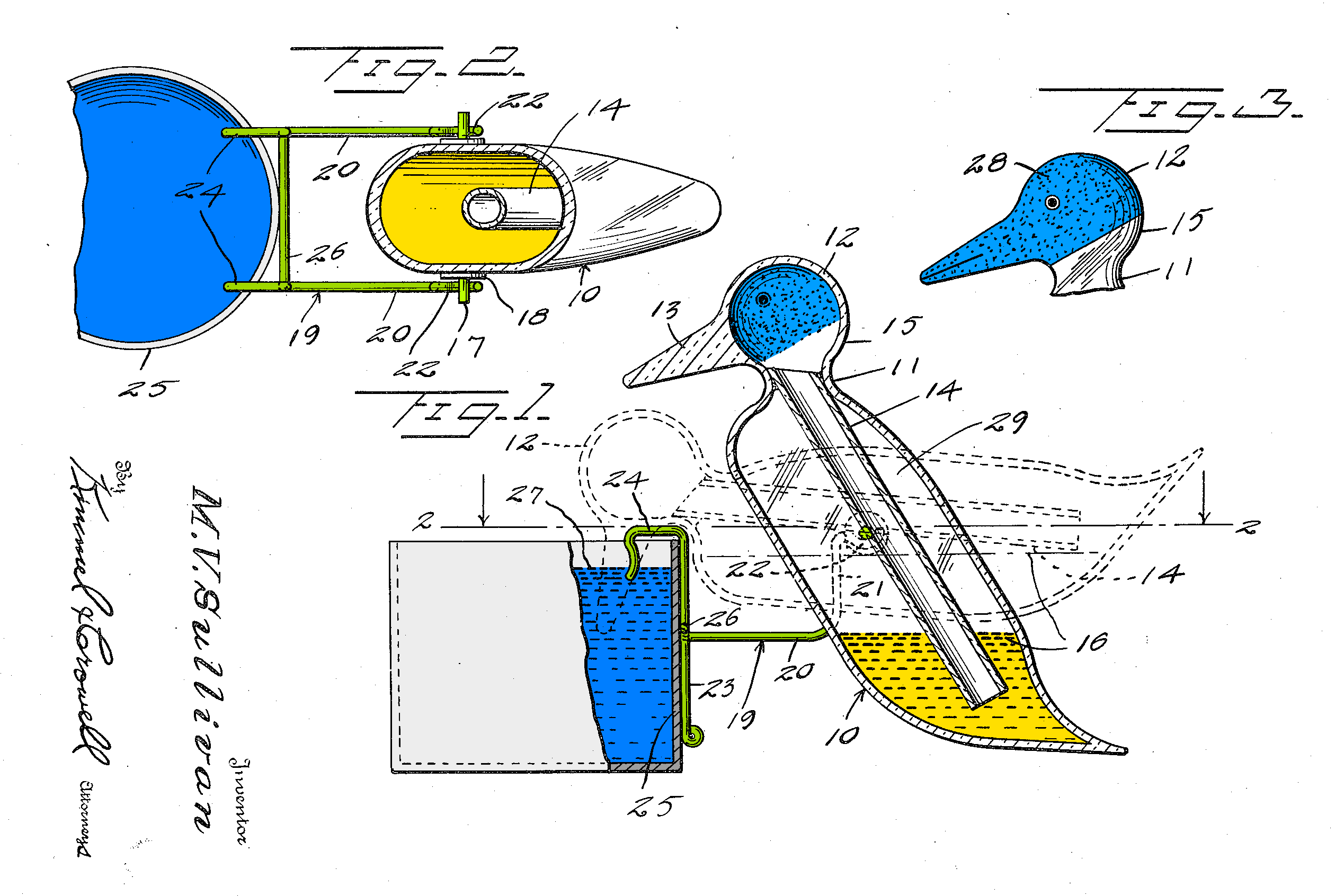
Miles V. Sullivan, 1945

=== Wally Minto's contribution ===
Wally Minto experimented with different working fluids. With the working fluids he used, he got the required temperature difference down, enabling the engine - for example - to run on solar power. Based on the working fluid, his improved wheel is also known as "Freon Power Wheel". Popular Science reported about in its March 1976 issue.

=== Examples ===
A working example of a Minto wheel was first published in a series of articles in The Mother Earth News, Issues #38 March, #39 May and #40 July 1976. Test units constructed by Mother Earth News (Issue 40, July 1976) and the MythBusters (Episode 24, December 5, 2004 – "Ming Dynasty Astronaut") did convert temperature difference into torque, but not as well as overenthusiastic boosters claimed.

== See also ==
- Drinking bird
- Stirling engine
- Ocean Thermal Energy Conversion
