= Wallace L. Minto =

Wallace L. Minto (August 6, 1921 – September 3, 1983) was an American nuclear physicist. who worked on the Manhattan Project.

== Early life and education ==
Minto had a passion for science at a very young age. For example, when he was 13 years old, he and his father, Wallace Milton Minto, piled up over 50 tons of uranium-rich ore in Sparta, New Jersey. He was also the first to split the uranium atom as a teenager. He almost caused a nuclear explosion in his parents' house.

At the age of 16, Wallace synthesized radium and invented what is now known as "Scotchlite". He had a copyright on his own periodic chart which renamed all the elements. He was a student at Columbia College When he was only 16.

== Career ==
He was instrumental in convincing Albert Einstein to write a letter to President Franklin D. Roosevelt (dated August 2, 1939) stressing the need for the United States to expand its experimentation with Atomic Energy, leading to the Manhattan Project. Consequently, Minto sold his uranium-rich ore to the U.S. Government for use in the Manhattan Project.

On June 26, 1944, Minto was enlisted by Andrew H. Dowdy, director of the Manhattan Department of the University of Rochester, to take charge of the Special Problems Division of the Manhattan Project. Minto reported directly to General Leslie Groves and reportedly threw Groves out of his lab for tampering with his beakers.

=== Discoveries and inventions ===
Minto discovered the method by which fish communicate, which is referenced in the July 1965 issue of Popular Mechanics. Hydronics, a low form of radiation, was also discovered by Minto.

Minto invented a non-polluting, organic Rankine cycle engine, which was licensed to Nissan Motor Company in 1972.

He invented the Jemeter, an electronic refractometer, utilized to distinguish gemstones.

Another of his inventions was the Minto Wheel, as a gift to Third World countries. Its purpose was to replace the mundane task of oxen and mules walking around in circles to grind corn or wheat and for the operation of a low-technology irrigation system.

== Death and legacy ==
Minto died on September 3, 1983, of myelofibrosis after a long battle. His disease was a direct result of his work on the Manhattan Project.
