= Saint Petersburg State Forestry University =

Public university in St. Petersburg, Russia

- Санкт-Петербу́ргский госуда́рственный лесотехни́ческий университе́т им. С. М. Ки́рова (СПбГЛТУ)
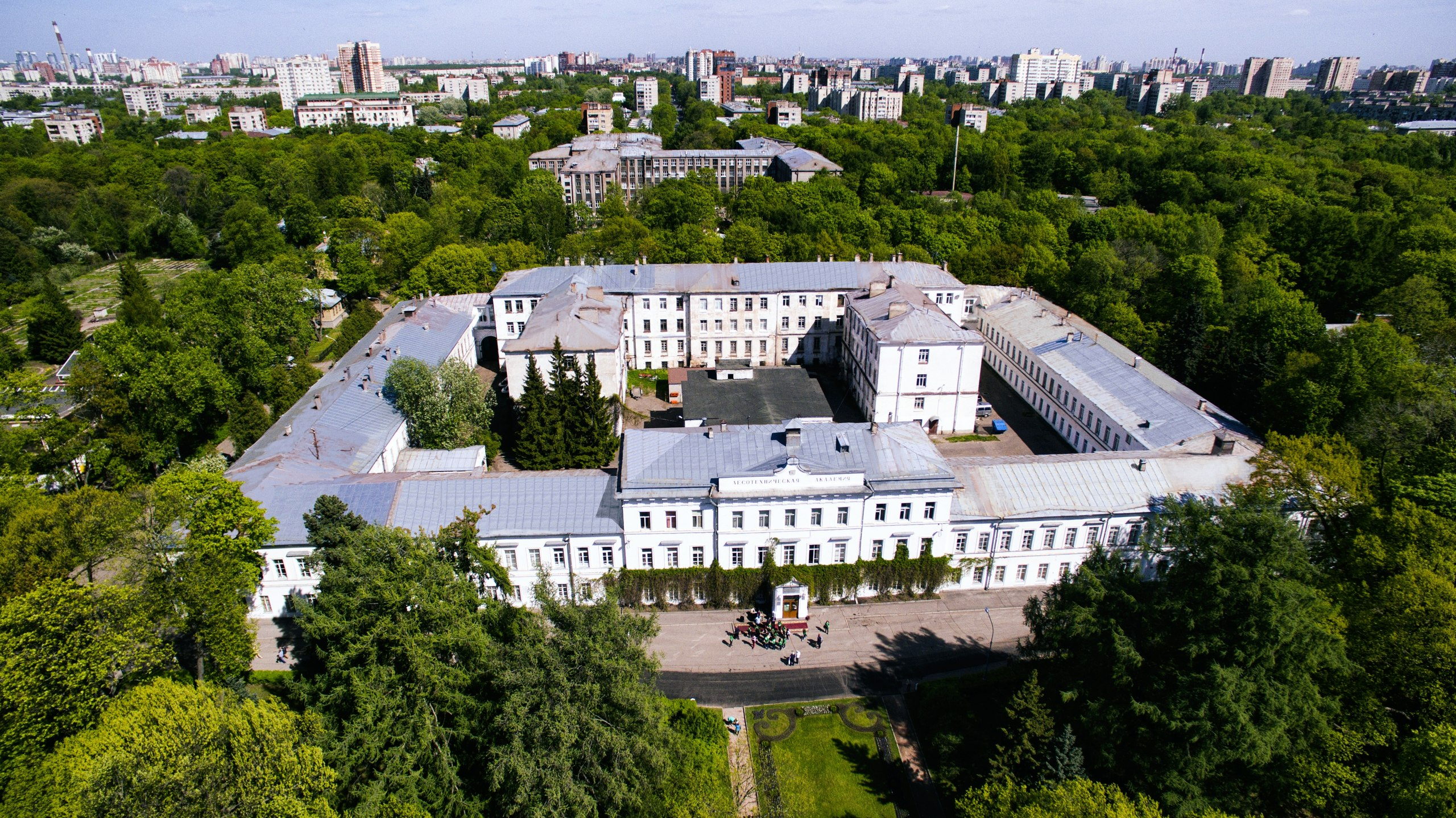
- Main building of the university in the park campus (front bird-eye view)
- Former names: Saint Petersburg (Leningrad) Forestry Academy, Forst-Institut, Forestry and Surveying Institute
- Type: state
- Established: 1803; 223 years ago
- Founders: Alexander I of Russia
- Officer in charge: Acting rector
- Rector: Melnichuk I.A.
- Students: 9350
- Location: 5 Institutskiy pereulok, Saint Petersburg, 194021, Russia; 59°59′35.22″N 30°20′37.17″E
- Language: Russian
- Website: spbftu.ru

Saint Petersburg State Forestry University (Russian: Санкт-Петербургский государственный лесотехнический университет им. С. М. Кирова (СПбГЛТУ) (also known under its former name Лесотехническая академия "Forestry academy", Rus. abbrev. ЛТА (LTA)) is a higher education institution in Saint Petersburg, Russia, founded in 1803 by an edict of Emperor Alexander I.

Saint Petersburg State Forestry University is a state-owned higher education institution, giving undergraduate, graduate and postgraduate education; it trains, retrains, and provides professional development for, people with degrees for industry work, research and teaching in the field of forest management, timber industry, wood mechanical processing, forest chemical industry, wood-pulp and paper industry, hydrolysis industry; it carries out theoretical and applied research. The university is a leading science and methodology center for the network of forestry degree colleges of Russia.

== History ==
The university was founded in 1803.

- On 19 May 1803 a royal edict approved the Statute of Establishment for a Practical Forestry School in Tsarskoe Selo. In a number of official documents the college was termed the Tsarskoe Selo Forestry Institute.
- In January 1811 the Tsarskoe Selo Forestry Institute was transferred to Saint Petersburg's north-bank Vyborg Side (placing the college in the wooden buildings of an old farm). After the Orloff Forestry Institute (founded in 1808 by Director of State Woods Orloff) was added, it was renamed the Forst-Institut.
- In 1813 the Forst-Institut was combined with Kozelsk Forestry Institute (founded in 1804). The joint educational establishment was styled the Saint Petersburg State Forestry Institute.
- In 1826—1833 the architects I. F. Lucchini (И. Ф. Лукини) and A. Nellinger (А. Неллингер) erected four separate academic buildings.
- In 1829 the Forst-Institut was renamed the Forestry Institute, and the length of study was increased from 4 to 6 years, and it opened admission to children aged 10 to 14.
- In 1837 the Saint Petersburg Forestry Institute reformed into a military school named the Forestry and Surveying Institute.
- In 1862 Forestry and Surveying Institute closed down, and the Forestry Academy was formed.
- In 1863—1864 buildings of Agricultural Institute were transferred from Gora-Gorki to the Forestry Academy, and the Saint Petersburg Agricultural Institute was set up with two departments: Agronomy and Forestry.
- In 1865 the Forestry Academy closed down.
- In November 1877 the Agronomy Department of the Agricultural Institute closed down in connection with the Forestry Department's transformation into Saint Petersburg Forestry Institute
- In 1914 the Saint Petersburg Forestry Institute renamed the Petrograd Forestry Institute.
- In 1924 it was renamed the Leningrad Forestry Institute.
- On 26 November 1929 a decree of the Central Executive Committee (ВЦИК) transformed the institute into an academy.
- On 27 September 1935 the academy was named after the assassinated Sergey Kirov.
- On 15 October 1953 a decree of the Presidium of the Supreme Soviet of the USSR awarded the academy an Order of Lenin.
- On 13 February 1992 the Leningrad Forestry Academy was renamed the Sergey Kirov Saint Petersburg Order of Lenin Forestry Academy.
- On 26 July 1993 it was renamed the Sergey Kirov Saint Petersburg Forestry Academy.
- On 30 April 1997 it was renamed the State Higher Education Institution Sergey Kirov Saint Petersburg Forestry Academy.
- On 10 February 2011 it was granted the status of a university.

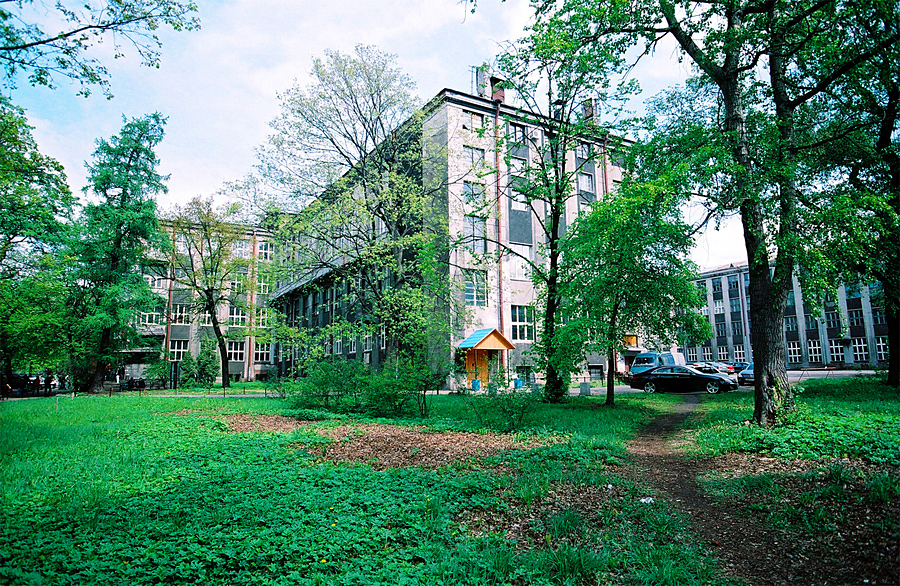
Second academic building

== Structure ==
A division and five institutes of the university are located in four buildings on the grounds of an oldest park in the city with total area exceeding 65 hectares, founded in 1827.

- Preparatory courses
- Institute of Forest Business and Innovation
- Institute of Technological Machines and Forest Transportation
- Institute of Forest and Natural Resources Management
- Institute of Landscape and Architecture, Construction and Wood Processing
- Institute of Chemical Wood Biomass Processing and Technospheric Safety
- Multi-industrial Professional Development Institute
- College of Secondary Special Education

== Management ==
Melnichuk I.A. - Acting rector (since 2020)

== Notable alumni and professors ==
The establishment until 1917 educated 4300 forest management experts.

== Gallery ==
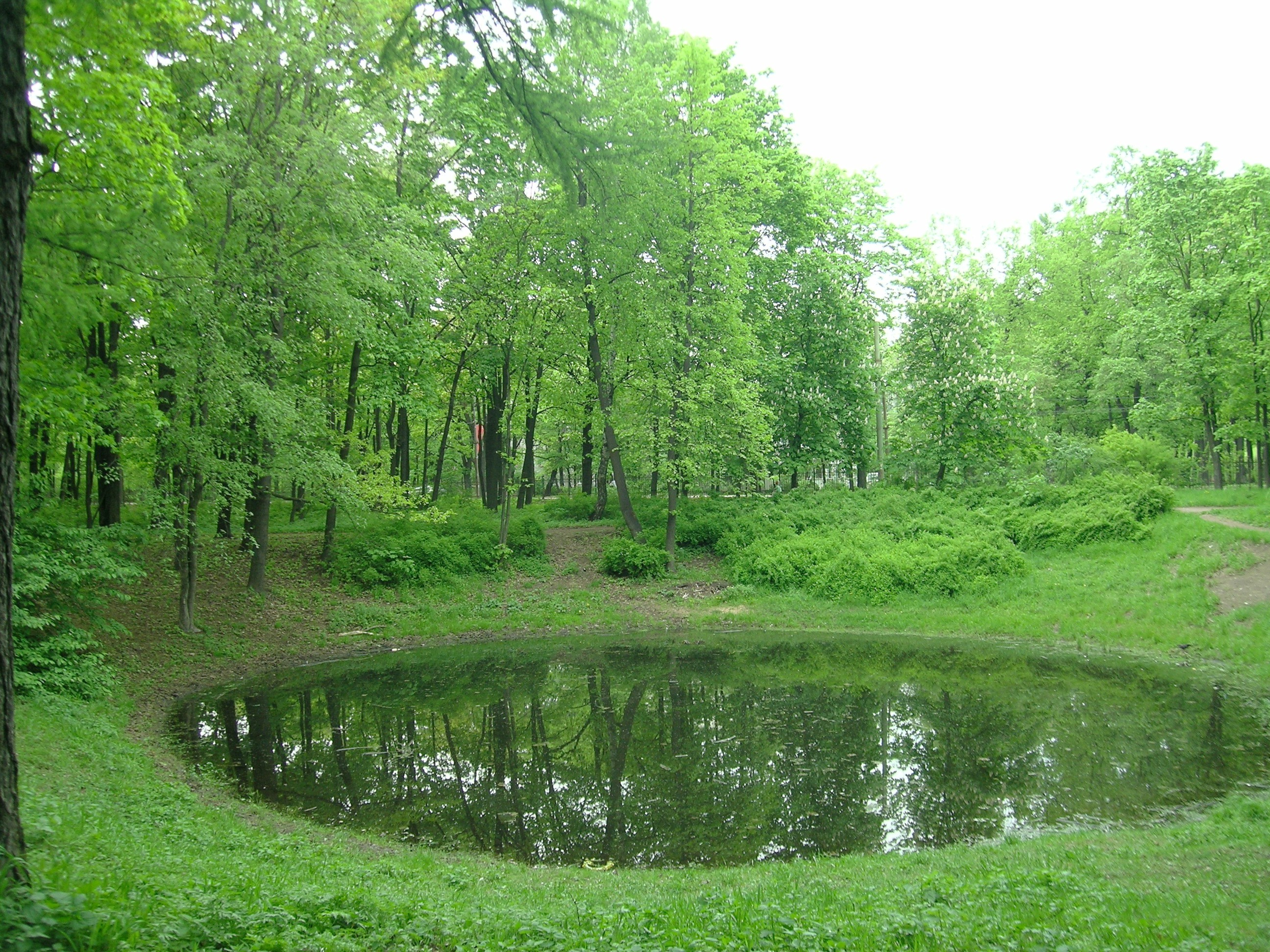

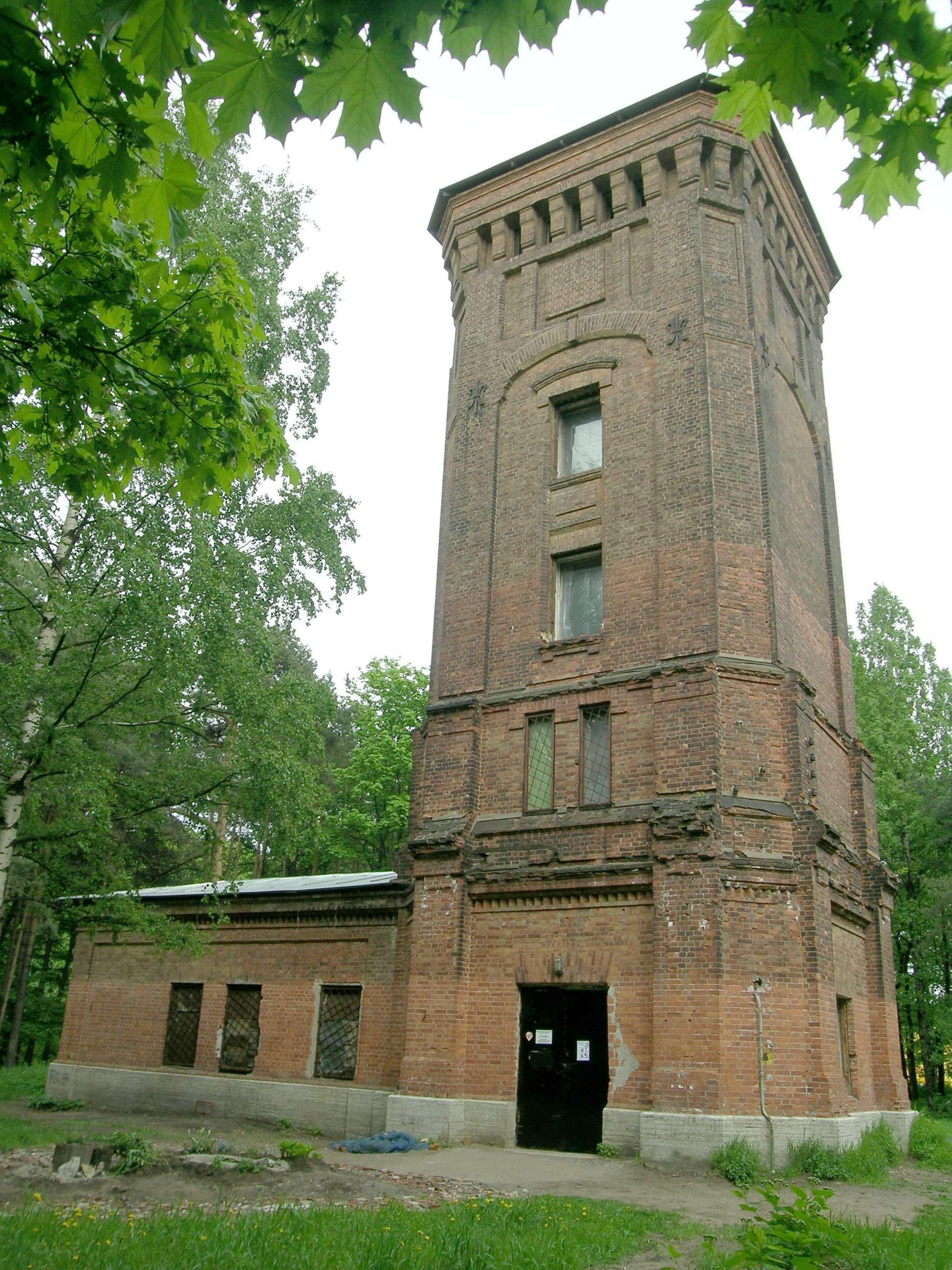

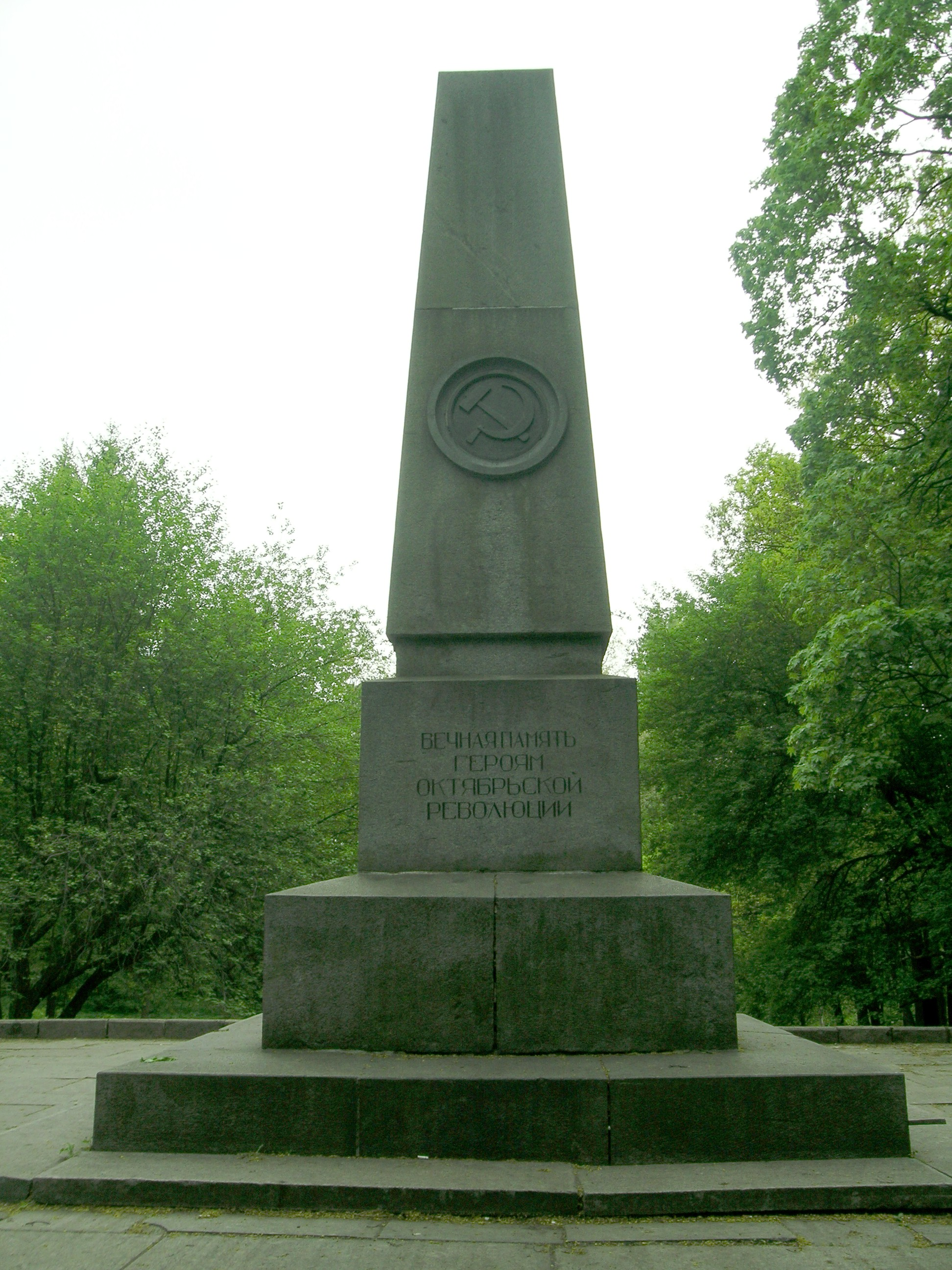

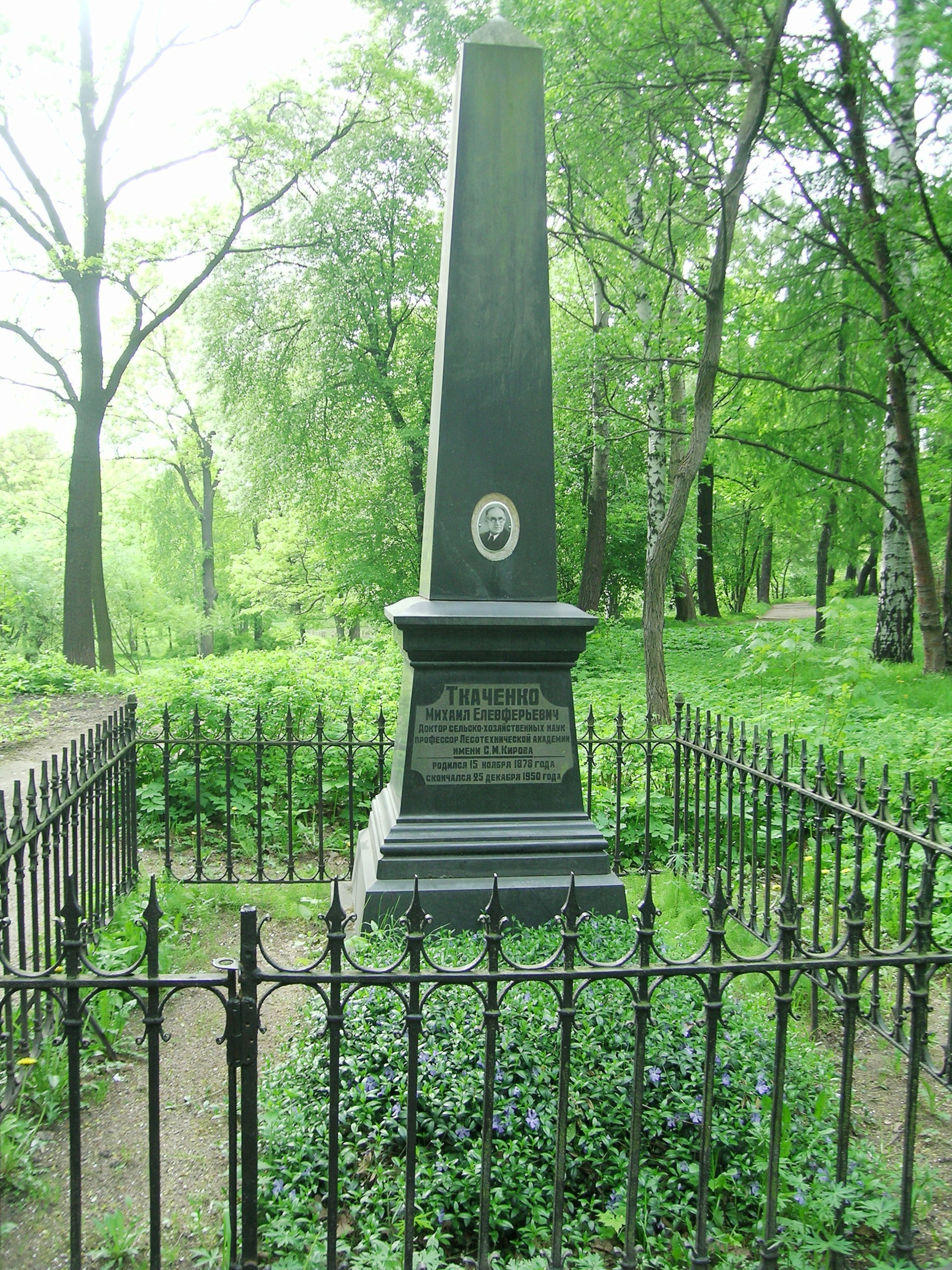

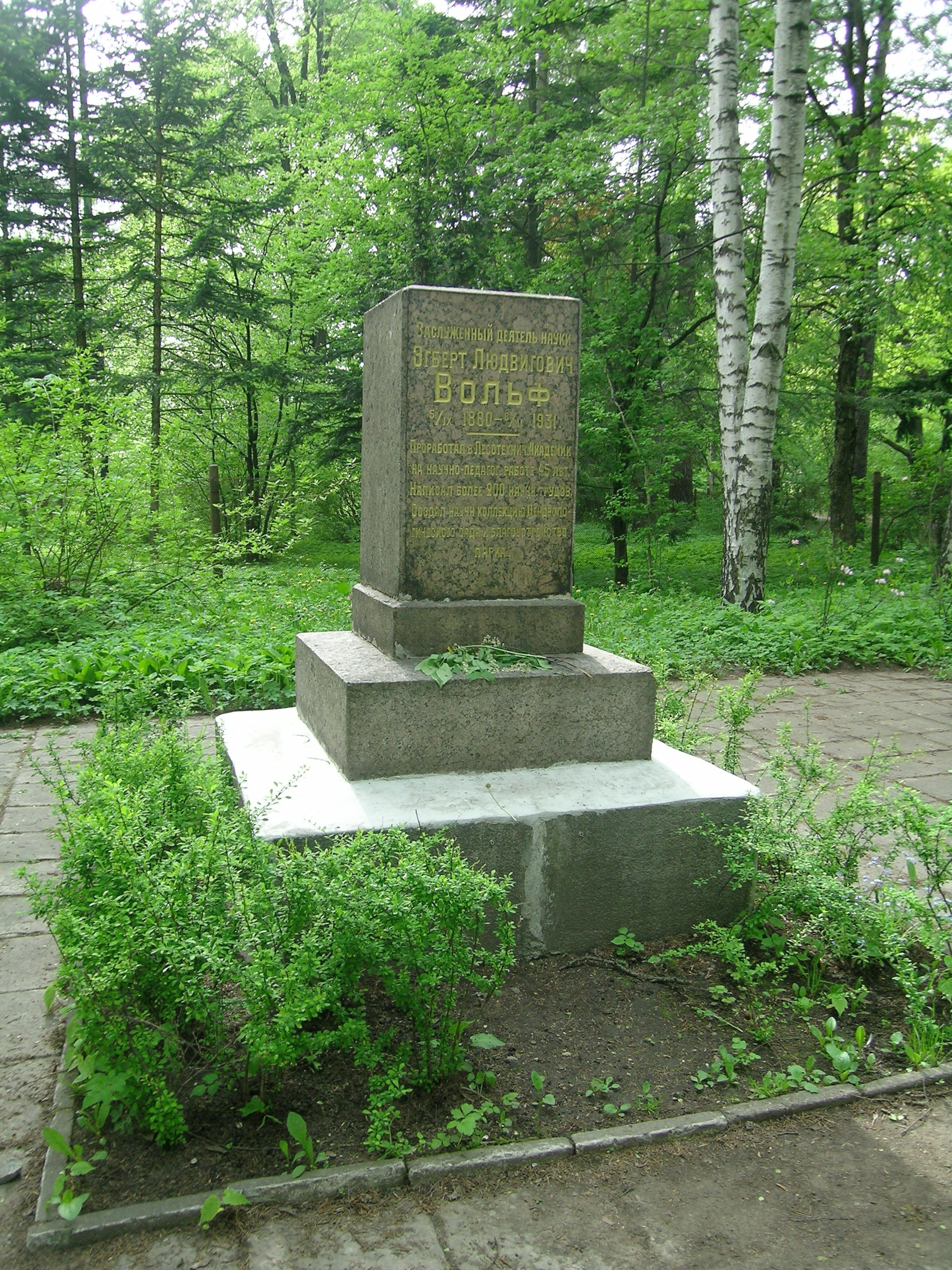

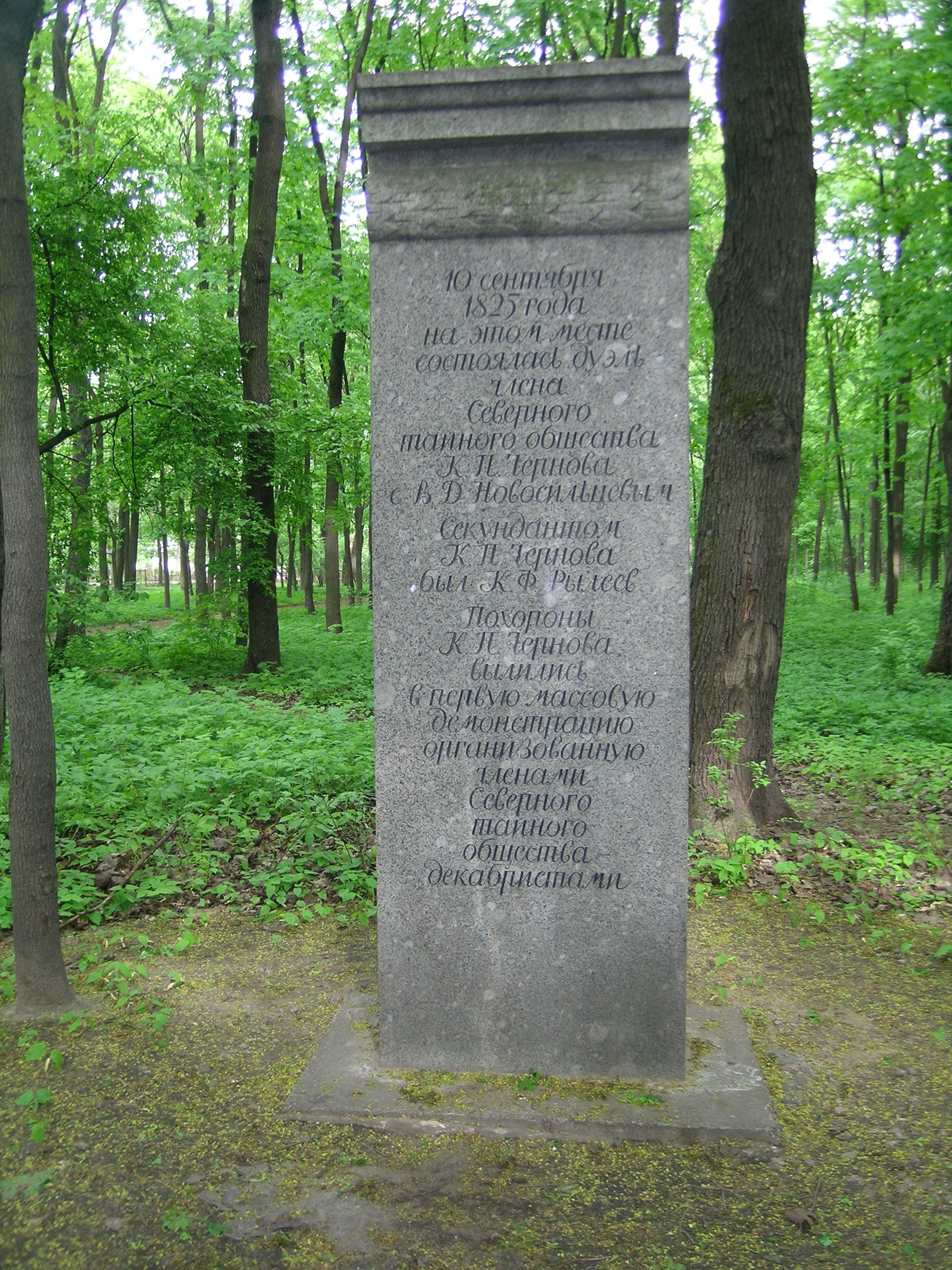

== Reading ==
- Лесные учебные заведения // Энциклопедический словарь Брокгауза и Ефрона : в 86 т. (82 т. и 4 доп.). – СПб., 1890–1907.
- Вереха П.Н., Орлов М. М. Исторический очерк развития С.-Петербургского лесного института (1803—1903) / под. ред. Э. Э. Керна. – СПб.: Государственная типография, 1903. – [14], 194, 157 с.

== Links ==
- University website
- Sergey Kirov Forestry Academy on Entsiklopediya Sankt-Peterburga
- A documentary film on the university of 1980s in Russian on YouTube.
- Syktyvkar Forest Institute website
