= Russian destroyer Rastoropny =

Rastoropny is the name of the following ships in the Russian Navy:

- Russian destroyer Rastoropny (1907), a Deyatelny-class destroyer, part of the Baltic Fleet during WWI, scrapped 1925
- Russian destroyer Rastoropny (1988), a Sovremenny-class destroyer, decommissioned in 2012

== See also ==
- Soviet destroyer Rastoropny
