= Russian destroyer Delny (1907) =

Imperial Russian destroyer

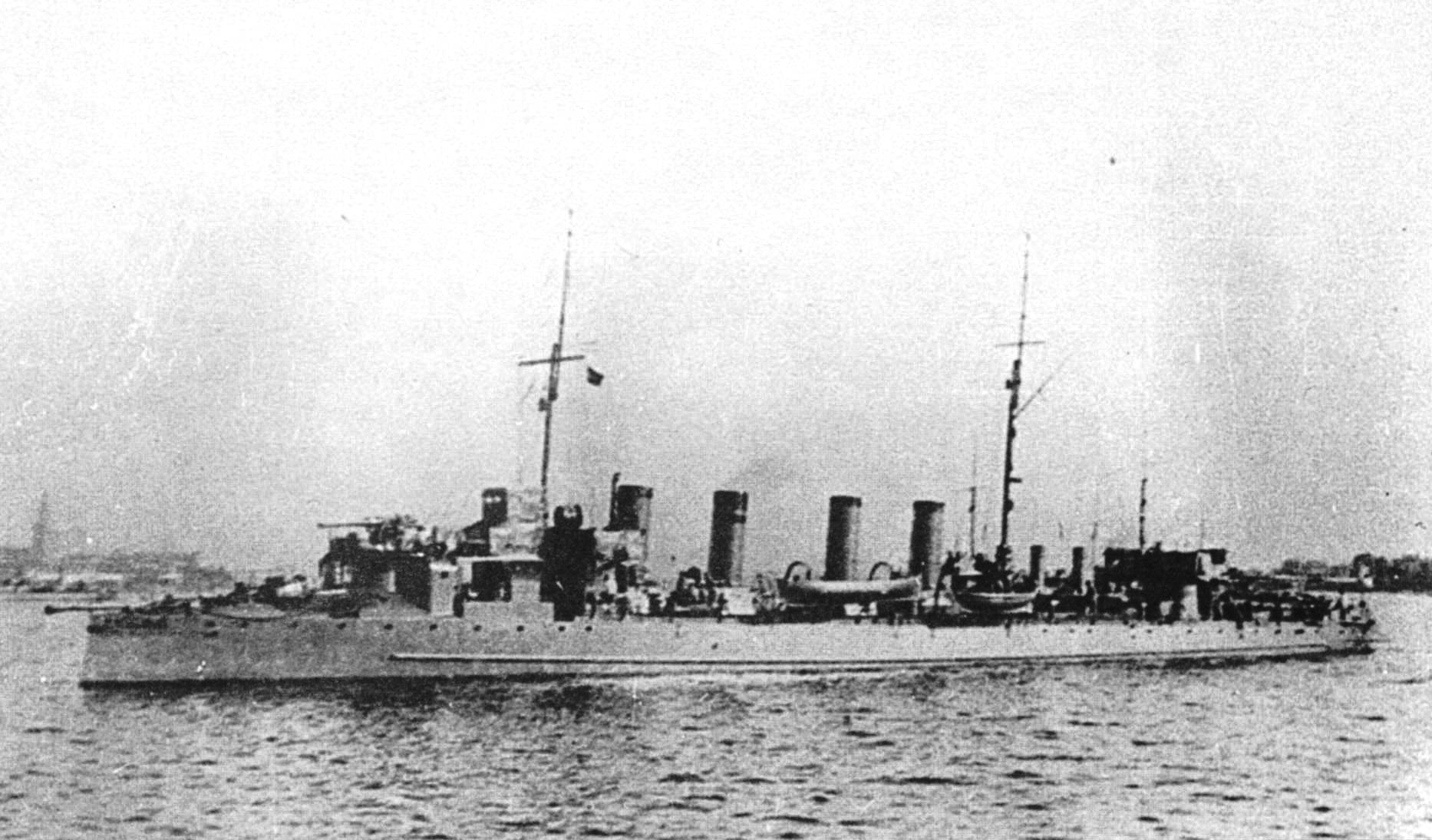

History

Russian Empire
- Name: Delny
- Builder: Nevsky Shipyard, Saint Petersburg
- Laid down: 1905
- Launched: 7 July 1907
- Completed: 22 November 1907
- Fate: Scrapped, 23 August 1922

General characteristics (as built)
- Class & type: Deyatelny-class destroyer
- Displacement: 382 t (376 long tons)
- Length: 64 m (210 ft 0 in)
- Beam: 6.4 m (21 ft)
- Draft: 2.59 m (8 ft 6 in) (deep load)
- Installed power: 4 Normand boilers; 6,000 ihp (4,474 kW)
- Propulsion: 2 shafts; 2 triple-expansion steam engines
- Speed: 26 knots (48 km/h; 30 mph)
- Range: 800–900 nmi (1,500–1,700 km; 920–1,040 mi) at 15 knots (28 km/h; 17 mph)
- Complement: 67
- Armament: 2 × single 75 mm (3 in) guns; 6 × single 7.62 mm (0.30 in) machine guns; 2 × single 450 mm (17.7 in) torpedo tubes; 18 × mines

Delny (Russian: Дельный) was one of eight Deyatelny-class destroyers built for the Imperial Russian Navy during the first decade of the 20th century. Completed in 1907, she served in the Baltic Fleet and participated in the First World War.

== Design and description ==
The Deyatelny-class ships displaced 382 metric tons (376 long tons) at normal load. They measured 64 meters (210 ft) long overall with a beam of 6.4 meters (21 ft), and a draft of 2.59 meters (8 ft 6 in). The ships were propelled by two vertical triple-expansion steam engines, each driving one propeller shaft using steam from four Normand boilers. The engines were designed to produce a total of 6,000 indicated horsepower (4,500 kW) for an intended maximum speed of 26 knots (48 km/h; 30 mph). During her sea trials, Delny reached 25.61 knots (47.43 km/h; 29.47 mph). The ships carried enough coal to give them a range of 800–900 nautical miles (1,500–1,700 km; 920–1,040 mi) at 15 knots (28 km/h; 17 mph). Their crew numbered 67 officers and men.

The main armament of the Deyatelny class consisted of two 50-caliber 75-millimeter (3 in) guns, one gun on the roof of the forward conning tower and the other at the stern. They were also armed with six 7.62 mm (0.30 in) machine guns. The ships were equipped with two 450-millimeter (17.7 in) torpedo tubes in single-tube rotating mounts. These were located fore and aft of the rear searchlight platform. They could carry 18 mines.

== Construction and career ==
Delny was laid down in 1905 by the Nevsky Shipyard in Ust-Izhora, Petrograd, and launched on 7 July 1907. She entered service on 22 November.

== Bibliography ==
- Afonin, N. N. (2004). "Nevki: Buiny-Class Destroyers and their Modifications". Squadron (in Russian) (2–3): 1–79.
- Apalkov, Yu. V. (1996). Боевые корабли русского флота: 8.1914-10.1917г [Combat Ships of the Russian Fleet: 8.1914-10.1917] (in Russian). Saint Petersburg, Russia: ИНТЕК. ISBN 5-7559-0018-3.
- Berezhnoy, S.S. (2002). Крейсера и Миносцы: Справочик [Cruisers and Destroyers: A Directory] (in Russian). Moscow: Ввоенное Ииздательство. ISBN 5-203-01780-8.
- Breyer, Siegfried (1992). Soviet Warship Development: Volume 1: 1917–1937. London: Conway Maritime Press. ISBN 0-85177-604-3.
- Budzbon, Przemysław (1985). "Russia". In Gray, Randal (ed.). Conway's All the World's Fighting Ships 1906–1921. Annapolis, Maryland: Naval Institute Press. pp. 291–325. ISBN 0-85177-245-5.
- Campbell, N. J. M. (1979). "Russia". In Chesneau, Roger & Kolesnik, Eugene M. (eds.). Conway's All the World's Fighting Ships 1860–1905. New York: Mayflower Books. pp. 170–217. ISBN 0-8317-0302-4.
- Halpern, Paul G. (1994). A Naval History of World War I. London: UCL Press. ISBN 1-85728-498-4.
- Harris, Mark (2025). The First World War in the Baltic Sea. Vol. 1: Essen's Triumph, 1914 to February 1915. Helion. ISBN 978-1-804519-10-3.
- Watts, Anthony J. (1990). The Imperial Russian Navy. London: Arms and Armour. ISBN 0-85368-912-1.
