= Soviet destroyer Razyashchy =

Razyashchy is the name of the following ships of the Imperial Russian Navy and/or the Soviet Navy

- Russian destroyer Razyashchy (1906), a Deyatelny-class destroyer that operated during WWI and was scrapped in 1925
- Soviet destroyer Razyashchy (1938), a Gnevny-class destroyer that served in the Soviet Pacific Fleet
