= Soviet destroyer Rastoropny =

Rastoropny is the name of the following ships in the Soviet Navy:

- Soviet destroyer Rastoropny (1938), a Gnevny-class destroyer, sold for scrap in 1965
- Soviet destroyer Rastoropny (1988), a Sovremenny-class destroyer, decommissioned in 2012

== See also ==
- Russian destroyer Rastoropny
