= Kommunarsky =

Kommunarsky (masculine), Kommunarskaya (feminine), or Kommunarskoye (neuter) may refer to:

- Kommunarskoye Urban Settlement, a municipal formation corresponding to Kommunarskoye Settlement Municipal Formation, an administrative division of Gatchinsky District of Leningrad Oblast, Russia
- Kommunarsky (rural locality), a rural locality (a settlement) in Krasnoyarsky District of Samara Oblast, Russia
