= Kolpinsky District =

Kolpinsky District Колпинский район (Russian)
- District
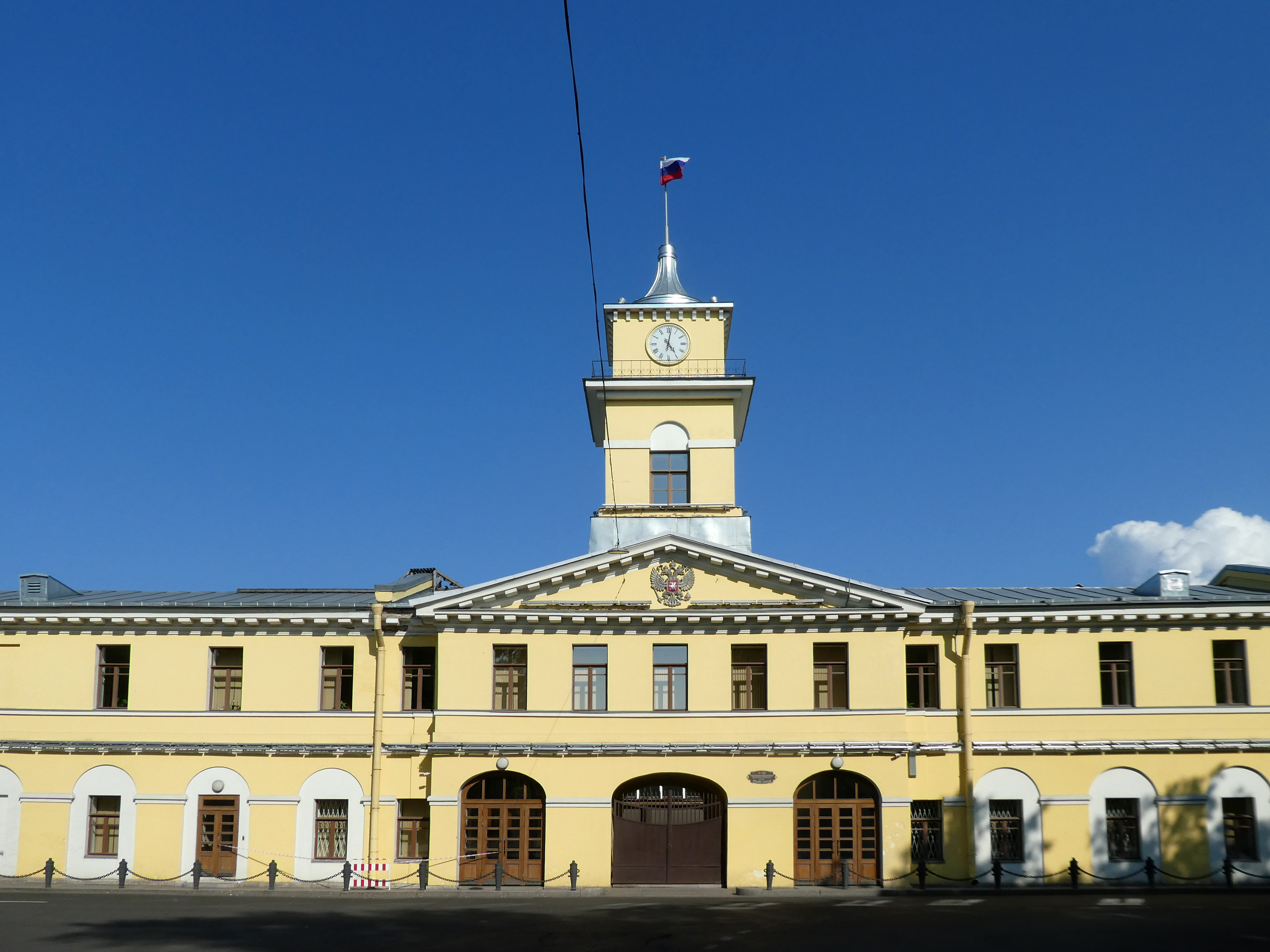
- Kolpinsky district administration at Kolpino

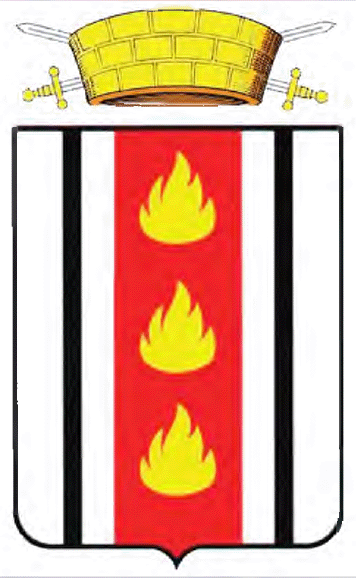
- Coat of arms
- Location of Kolpinsky district in Saint Petersburg
- Coordinates: 59°46′40″N 30°35′58″E
- Country: Russia
- Federal subject: Saint Petersburg
- Established: 1936

Area
  - Total: 105.8 km^{2} (40.8 sq mi)

Population
  - Estimate (2022): 175,392
- Website: gov.spb.ru

Kolpinsky District (Russian: Колпинский район) is an administrative and municipal district in Russia. It is one of the 18 raions in Saint Petersburg. Spread over an area of 102.9 km^{2} (39.7 sq mi), the district had a population of 175,396 in 2022. The city of Kolpino is the seat of the district. The Neva and Izhora rivers confluence near Ust-Izhora in the district.

== History ==
The name of the district is derived from the name of the city of Kolpino. The Finno-Ugric tribes were the early inhabitants of the region. In the 12th century CE, Russian settlements appeared as sea based trade routes developed around the area.

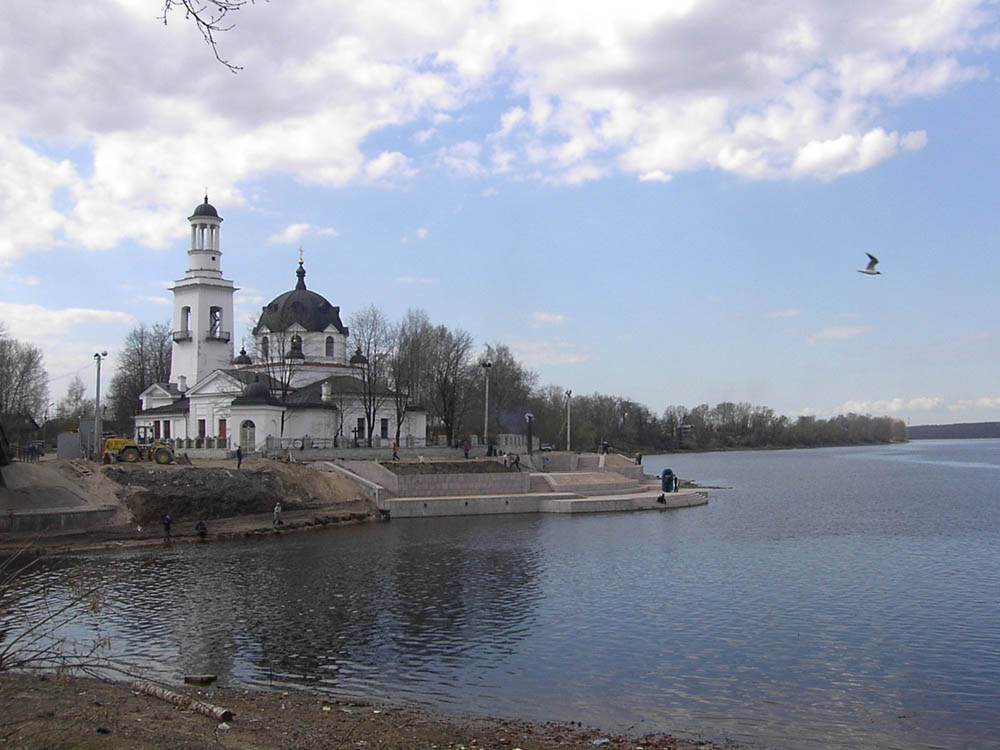
Alexander Nevsky chapel at the confluence of Neva and Izhora rivers

Prince Alexander Nevsky won the battle against the Kingdom of Sweden, including Norwegian, Finnish and Tavastian forces, on the Neva River, near the settlement of Ust-Izhora, on 15 July 1240. Since the 13th century, the region was part of the Novgorod Republic, and was later merged with the Moscow state in the 15th century. The Swedish Empire captured the region briefly, before the Russian Empire re-captured it during the Great Northern War of 1700-1721.

During the reign of Peter the Great, pine and oak wood was required for the construction of the Baltic fleet, and the region became the center of timber industry. In 1722, Alexander Danilovich Menshikov oversaw the construction of a number of sawmills, and a dam on the Izhora River. By the 18th century, the region has developed into an industrial belt with timber storage yards, copper smelting plants, and metal processing industries. In 1798, it was given the official name of Admiralty Izhora Plants.

== Geography ==
Kolpinsky is one of the 18 administrative and municipal districts (raion) in Saint Petersburg. Spread over an area of 102.9 km^{2} (39.7 sq mi), the district had a population of 175,396 in 2022. The city of Kolpino is the seat of the district. The Neva and Izhora rivers flow through the district and confluence near Ust-Izhora in the district. Despite its early industrial development, Kolpinsky is amongst the poorly developed districts in Saint Petersburg raion.

== See also ==
- Administrative divisions of Saint Petersburg
