= Kommunar, Gatchinsky District, Leningrad Oblast =

Town in Leningrad Oblast, Russia

Kommunar Коммунар
- Town
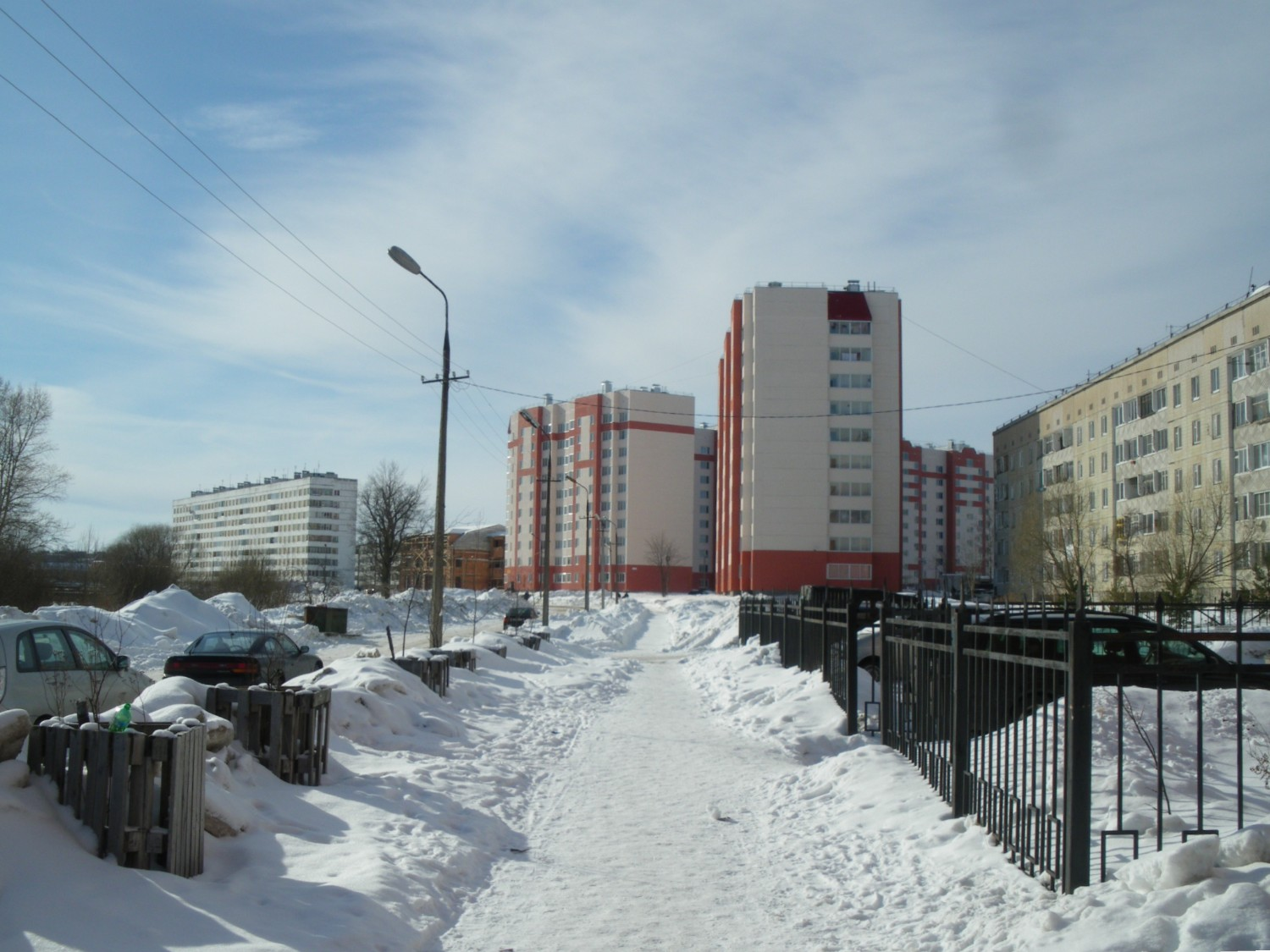
- Izhorskaya Street in Kommunar

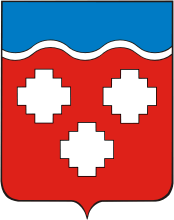
- Flag Coat of arms
- Interactive map of Kommunar
- Location of Kommunar Kommunar (Leningrad Oblast)
- Coordinates: 59°38′N 30°24′E
- Country: Russia
- Federal subject: Leningrad Oblast
- Administrative district: Gatchinsky District
- Settlement municipal formationSelsoviet: Kommunarskoye Settlement Municipal Formation
- Founded: 1840s
- Town status since: June 28, 1993

Population (2010 Census)
  - Total: 20,211
  - Estimate (2024): 25,706 (+27.2%)

Administrative status
  - Capital of: Kommunarskoye Settlement Municipal Formation

Municipal status
  - Municipal district: Gatchinsky Municipal District
  - Urban settlement: Kommunarskoye Urban Settlement
  - Capital of: Kommunarskoye Urban Settlement
- Time zone: UTC+3 (MSK)
- Postal code: 188320–188322
- OKTMO ID: 41618105001
- Website: www.kommunar.spb.ru

Kommunar (Russian: Коммуна́р) is a town in Gatchinsky District of Leningrad Oblast, Russia, located on the banks of the Izhora River 35 kilometers (22 mi) south of the center of St. Petersburg. Population: 20,211 (2010 census); 17,164 (2002 census); 17,791 (1989 Soviet census). The name of the town means "Communards", in reference to supporters of the 1871 popular uprising in Paris.

== History ==
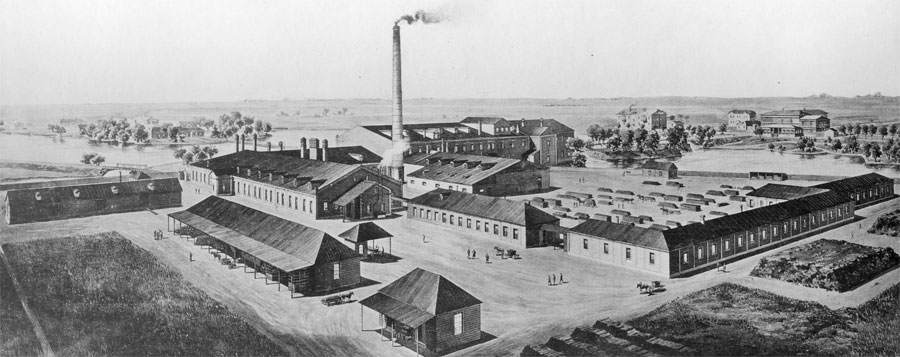
Historical image of the paper mill

It was founded in the 1840s by the land owner countess Yuliya Samoylova as Grafskaya Slavyanka (Гра́фская Славя́нка). In 1846, it was purchased by the government and renamed Tsarskaya Slavyanka (Ца́рская Славя́нка). Until 1918, it was also known as the settlement at the Rogers and Peiffer factory (посёлок при фабрике Роджерса и Пейффера). In 1918, it was renamed Krasnaya Slavyanka. In the beginning of the 20th century, it was a part of Tsarskoselsky Uyezd of St. Petersburg Governorate (renamed in 1913 Petrograd Governorate and in 1924 Leningrad Governorate). On November 20, 1918, the uyezd was renamed Detskoselsky. On February 14, 1923 Detskoselsky and Petergofsky Uyezds were abolished and merged into Gatchinsky Uyezd, with the administrative center located in Gatchina. On February 14, 1923, Gatchina was renamed Trotsk and Gatchinsky Uyezd was renamed Trotsky Uyezd, after Leon Trotsky.

On August 1, 1927, the uyezds were abolished and Trotsky District, with the administrative center in the town of Trotsk, was established. The governorates were also abolished and the district became a part of Leningrad Okrug of Leningrad Oblast. The settlement was made a part of Trotsky District. On August 2, 1929, after Trotsky was deported from Soviet Union, Trotsk was renamed Krasnogvardeysk and the district was renamed Krasnogvardeysky. On July 23, 1930, the okrugs were abolished as well and the districts were directly subordinated to the oblast. On January 28, 1944, Krasnogvardeysk was renamed Gatchina and the district was renamed Gatchinsky.

Kommunar was granted urban-type settlement status on October 8, 1953 and town status on June 28, 1993. In 1996, the town held a popular vote regarding whether it should become a town of oblast significance. However, in 2010 the administrative divisions of Leningrad Oblast were harmonized with its municipal divisions, and Kommunar became the town of district significance again.

== Administrative and municipal status ==
Within the framework of administrative divisions, it is incorporated within Gatchinsky District as Kommunarskoye Settlement Municipal Formation. As a municipal division, Kommunarskoye Settlement Municipal Formation is incorporated within Gatchinsky Municipal District as Kommunarskoye Urban Settlement.

== Economy ==
=== Industry ===
The main enterprise of the town is the Kommunar paper factory.

=== Transportation ===
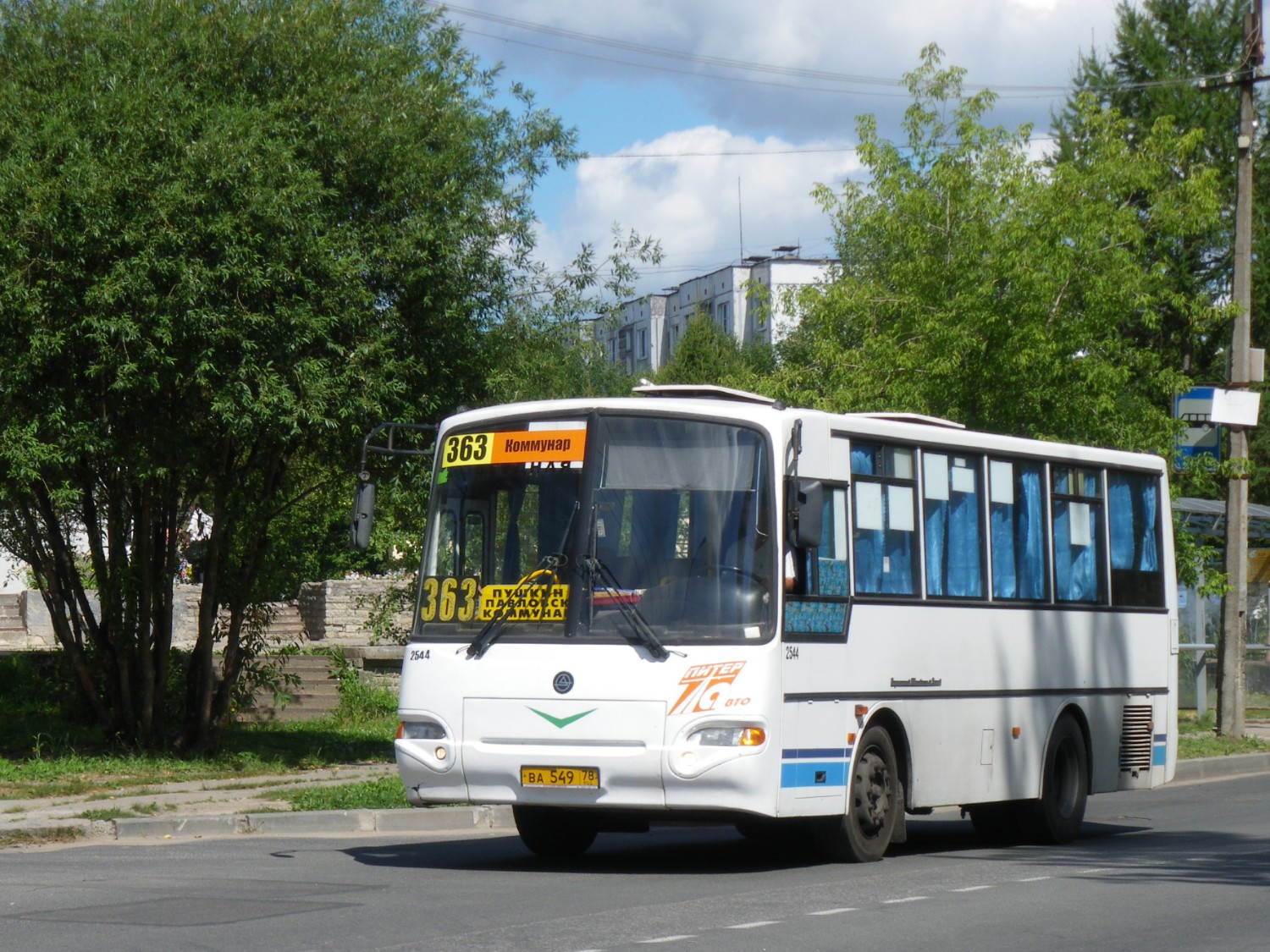
A bus connecting Pushkin and Kommunar on Sadovaya Street

A railway connecting St. Petersburg and Novosokolniki via Dno runs along the eastern border of the town. Antropshino railway station, located in Kommunar, has suburban service originating from Vitebsky railway station of St. Petersburg.

Kommunar is essentially a suburb of St. Petersburg and is included in the suburban road network. In particular, it is connected by road with Gatchina.

== Culture and recreation ==
A mass grave of Soviet soldiers killed during the Russian Civil War and World War II in Kommunar is protected as a historical monument of local significance.
