= Izhora =

Izhora Inger, Inkere
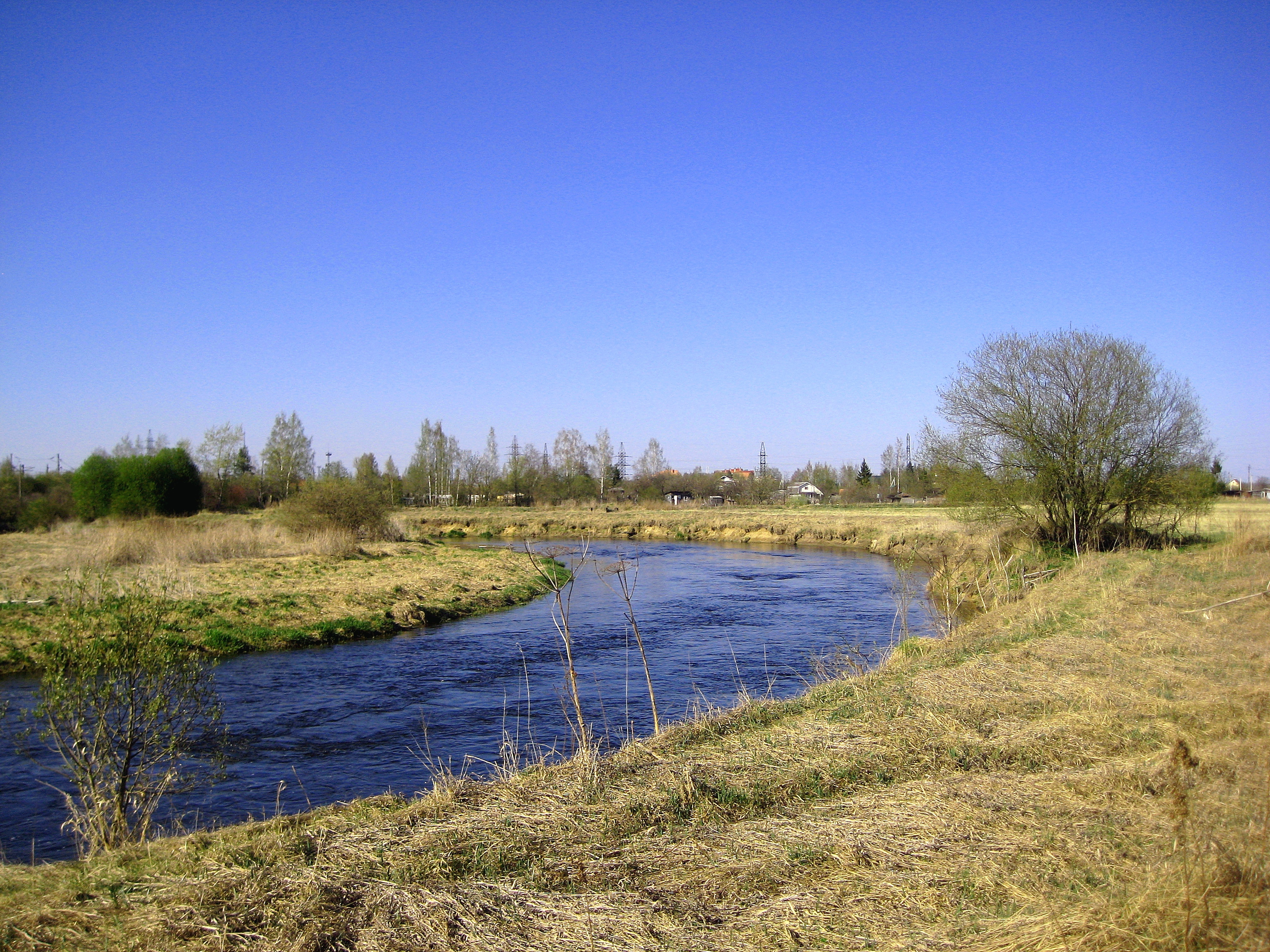
- The Izhora River in Kommunar
- Native name: Ижора (Russian)

Location
- Country: Russia
- Regions: Leningrad Oblast, Saint Petersburg
- Cities: Kommunar, Kolpino, Ust-Izhora

Physical characteristics
- Source
  - location: Skvoritsy, Leningrad Oblast
  - coordinates: 59°39′11″N 26°56′59″E
  - elevation: 93 m (305 ft)
- Mouth: Neva
  - location: Ust-Izhora, Saint Petersburg
  - coordinates: 59.803°N 30.603°E
  - elevation: 3 m (9.8 ft)
- Length: 76 km (47 mi)
- Basin size: 1,000 km^{2} (390 sq mi)
- Width
  - minimum: 2.36 m (7.7 ft)
  - average: 32 m (105 ft)
  - maximum: 60 m (200 ft)
- Depth
  - minimum: 0.66 m (2.2 ft)
  - average: 2.5 m (8.2 ft)
  - maximum: 4 m (13 ft)
- Discharge
  - average: 11.37 m^{3}/s (402 cu ft/s)

Basin features
- Progression: Neva→ Gulf of Finland

The Izhora (Russian: Ижора, Finnish: Inkereenjoki), also known as the Inger, is a left tributary of the Neva on its run through Ingria in northwestern Russia from Lake Ladoga to the Gulf of Finland. The Izhora flows through Gatchinsky and Tosnensky Districts of Leningrad Oblast as well as through Pushkinsky and Kolpinsky Districts of the federal city of Saint Petersburg. The settlement of Ust-Izhora (lit. "mouth of Izhora") is situated at the confluence of Izhora and Neva, halfway between Saint Petersburg and Shlisselburg. The towns of Kommunar and Kolpino are located on the Izhora as well. The river is noted as the farthest Swedish forces ever reached between the Viking Age and the Time of Troubles.

The length of the Izhora is 76 kilometres (47 mi), and the area of its drainage basin is 1,000 square kilometres (390 mi^{2}). The river draws its water mainly from natural groundwater springs, snow melt, and rain water. The river has a sustainable underground water supply in both summer and winter, never drying up or freezing through.

The source of the Izhora is located on the Izhora Plateau at the village of Skvoritsy, northwest of the town of Gatchina. The Izhora flows to the east, passes at the northern outskirts of Gatchina, and east of Kommunar enters Tosnensky District. There, for a short stretch it makes the border between Saint Petersburg (north) and Leningrad Oblast (south), returns to the oblast and gradually turns north. In Kolpino, the Izhora enters the federal city of Saint Petersburg. There, it flow north and joins the Neva in the settlement of Ust-Izhora.

The drainage basin of the Izhora includes the northern parts of Gatchinsky and Tosnensky Districts, as well as some areas within Saint Petersburg.
