= Deyatelny-class destroyer =

Early 20th-century Imperial Russian destroyer class

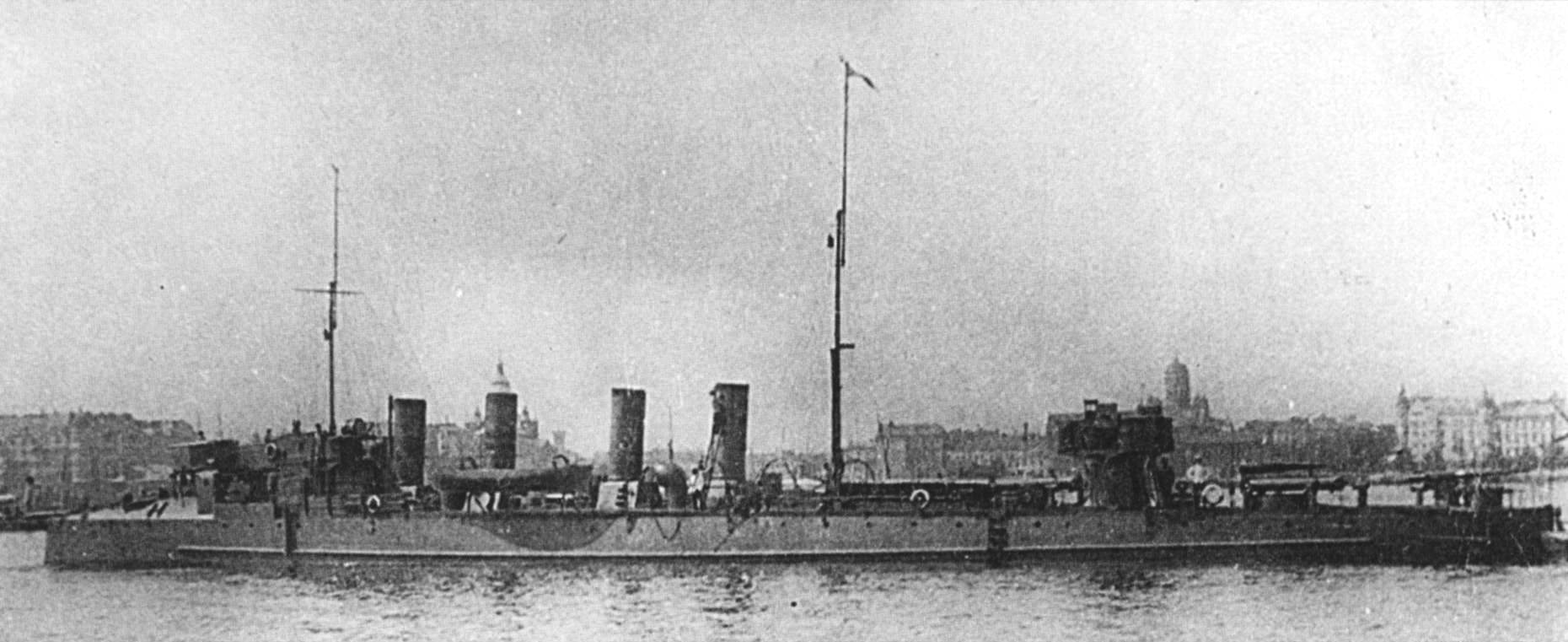
- Deyatelny

Class overview
- Builders: Nevsky Shipyard, Saint Petersburg
- Operators: Imperial Russian Navy; (Russian Soviet Federative Socialist Republic) Red Fleet
- Built: 1905–1908
- In commission: 1907–1925
- Completed: 8
- Lost: 1
- Scrapped: 7

General characteristics (as built)
- Type: Destroyer
- Displacement: 382 t (376 long tons)
- Length: 64 m (210 ft 0 in)
- Beam: 6.4 m (21 ft)
- Draft: 2.59 m (8 ft 6 in) (deep load)
- Installed power: 4 Normand boilers; 6,000 ihp (4,474 kW)
- Propulsion: 2 shafts; 2 triple-expansion steam engines
- Speed: 26 knots (48 km/h; 30 mph)
- Range: 800–900 nmi (1,500–1,700 km; 920–1,040 mi) at 15 knots (28 km/h; 17 mph)
- Complement: 67
- Armament: 2 × single 75 mm (3 in) guns; 6 × single 7.62 mm (0.30 in) machine guns; 2 × single 450 mm (17.7 in) torpedo tubes; 18 × mines

The Deyatelny class (Russian: Деятельный) consisted of eight destroyers built for the Imperial Russian Navy during the first decade of the 20th century. They served in the Baltic Fleet and participated in the First World War.

== Design and description ==
The Deyatelny-class ships displaced 382 metric tons (376 long tons) at normal load. They measured 64 meters (210 ft 0 in) long overall with a beam of 6.4 meters (21 ft 0 in), and a draft of 2.59 meters (8 ft 6 in). The ships were propelled by two vertical triple-expansion steam engines, each driving one propeller shaft using steam from four Normand boilers that had a working pressure of 17 kg/cm^{2} (1,667 kPa; 242 psi). The engines were designed to produce a total of 6,000 indicated horsepower (4,500 kW) for an intended maximum speed of 26 knots (48 km/h; 30 mph). The ships normally carried 90 metric tons (89 long tons) of coal, but could carry a maximum of 110 metric tons (108 long tons). This gave them a range of 800–900 nautical miles (1,500–1,700 km; 920–1,040 mi) at 15 knots (28 km/h; 17 mph). Their crew numbered 67 officers and men.

The main armament of the Deyatelny class consisted of two 50-caliber 75-millimeter (3 in) guns, one gun on the roof of the forward conning tower and the other at the stern. They were also armed with six 7.62 mm (0.30 in) machine guns. The ships were equipped with two 450-millimeter (17.7 in) torpedo tubes in single-tube rotating mounts. These were located fore and aft of the rear searchlight platform. They could carry 18 mines.

== Ships ==
Construction data
| Name | Laid down | Launched | Entered Service | Fate |
|---|---|---|---|---|
| Delny | 1905 | 7 July 1907 | 22 November 1907 | Scrapped, 23 August 1922 |
| Deyatelny | 1905 | 7 July 1907 | 22 November 1907 | Scrapped, 21 November 1925 |
| Dostoyny | 1905 | 7 July 1907 | 22 November 1907 | Scrapped, 21 November 1925 |
| Rastoropny | 1905 | 8 May 1907 | 1 April 1908 | Scrapped, 21 November 1925 |
| Razyashchy | 2 April 1905 | 4 September 1906 | 1 April 1908 | Scrapped, 21 November 1925 |
| Silny | 1905 | 23 August 1905 | 22 November 1907 | Scrapped, 21 November 1925 |
| Storozhevoy | 1905 | 11 August 1906 | 15 December 1907 | Scrapped, 21 November 1925 |
| Stroyny | 1905 | 20 December 1906 | 15 December 1907 | Ran aground and wrecked, 21 August 1917 |

== Bibliography ==
- Afonin, N. N. (2004). "Nevki: Buiny-Class Destroyers and their Modifications". Squadron (in Russian) (2–3): 1–79.
- Apalkov, Yu. V. (1996). Боевые корабли русского флота: 8.1914-10.1917г [Combat ships of the Russian fleet: 8.1914-10.1917] (in Russian). Saint Petersburg, Russia: ИНТЕК. ISBN 5-7559-0018-3.
- Berezhnoy, S.S. (2002). Крейсера и Миносцы: Справочик [Cruisers and Destroyers: A Directory] (in Russian). Moscow: Ввоенное Ииздательство. ISBN 5-203-01780-8.
- Breyer, Siegfried (1992). Soviet Warship Development: Volume 1: 1917–1937. London: Conway Maritime Press. ISBN 0-85177-604-3.
- Budzbon, Przemysław (1985). "Russia". In Gray, Randal (ed.). Conway's All the World's Fighting Ships 1906–1921. Annapolis, Maryland: Naval Institute Press. pp. 291–325. ISBN 0-85177-245-5.
- Campbell, N. J. M. (1979). "Russia". In Chesneau, Roger & Kolesnik, Eugene M. (eds.). Conway's All the World's Fighting Ships 1860–1905. New York: Mayflower Books. pp. 170–217. ISBN 0-8317-0302-4.
- Halpern, Paul G. (1994). A Naval History of World War I. London: UCL Press. ISBN 1-85728-498-4.
- Harris, Mark (2025). The First World War in the Baltic Sea. Vol. 1: Essen's Triumph, 1914 to February 1915. Helion. ISBN 978-1-804519-10-3.
- Watts, Anthony J. (1990). The Imperial Russian Navy. London: Arms and Armour. ISBN 0-85368-912-1.
