= Kolpino =

Municipal city in Russia

Coordinates: 59°44′N 30°36′E

Location of Kolpino within the federal city of Saint Petersburg (2006)

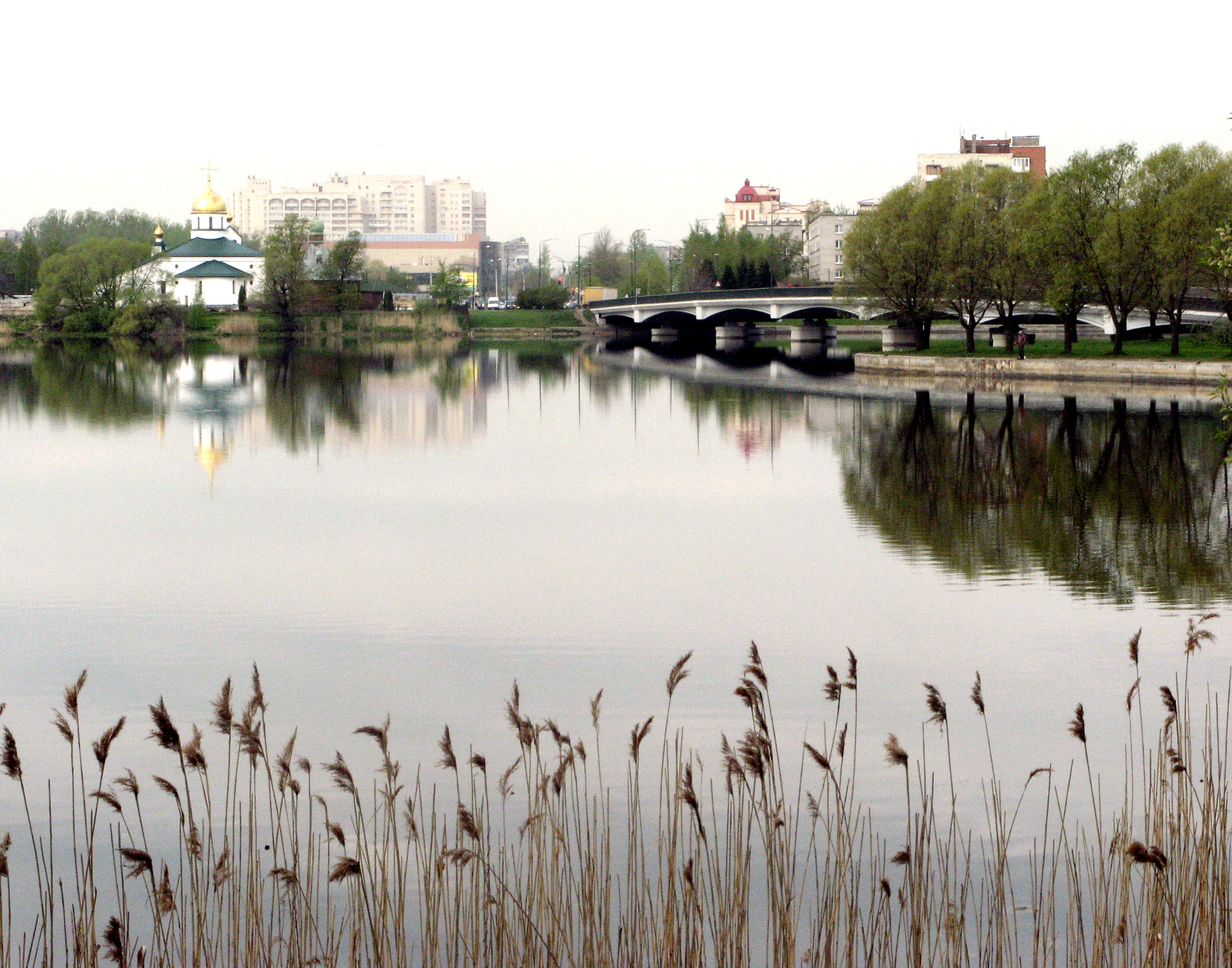
Troitsky sobor, Izhora river, and the bridge

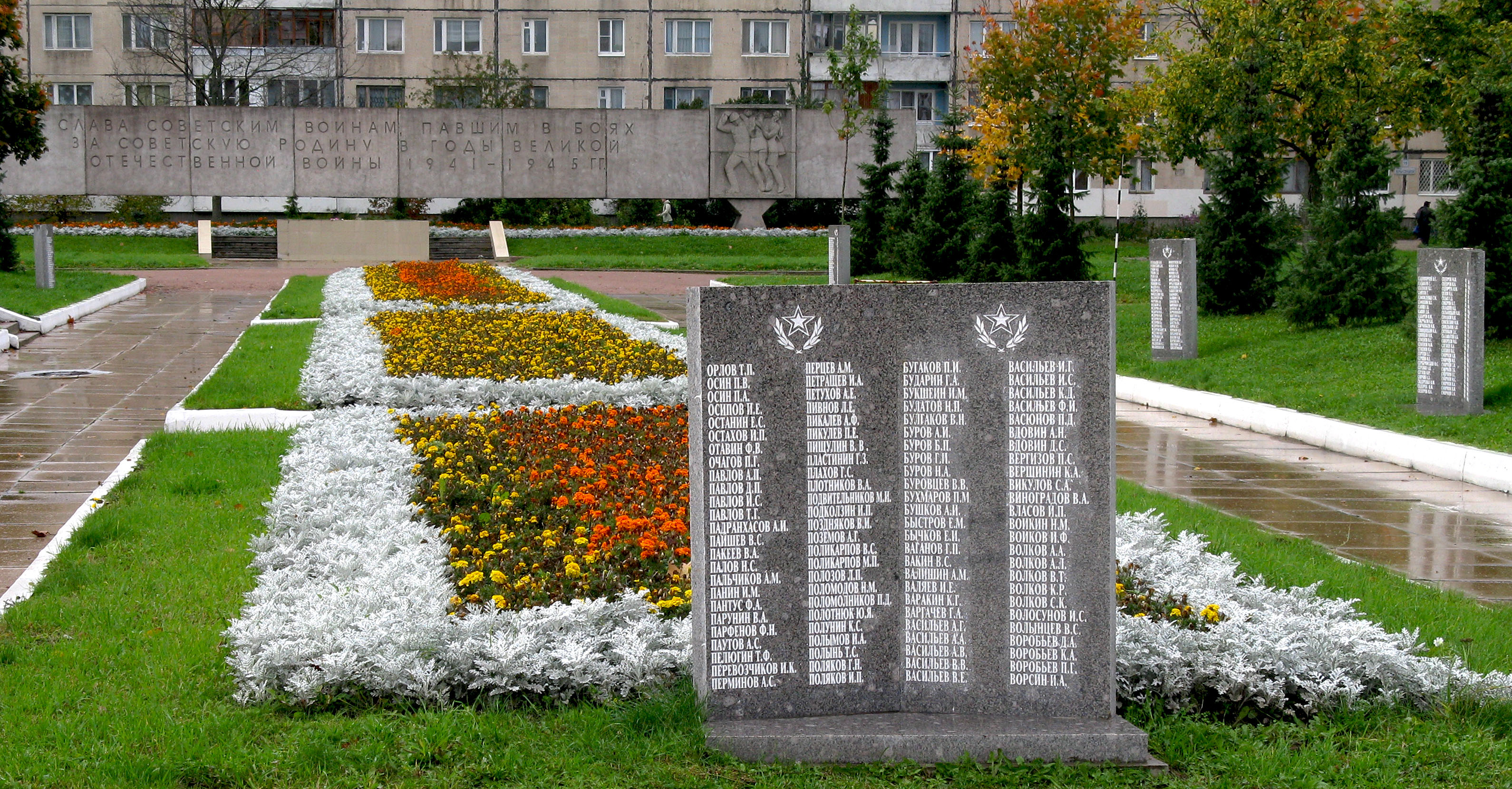
The memorial devoted to victims of World War II. Brotherhood cemetery of about 888 soviet soldiers. Street of Vera Slutskaya, Kolpino.

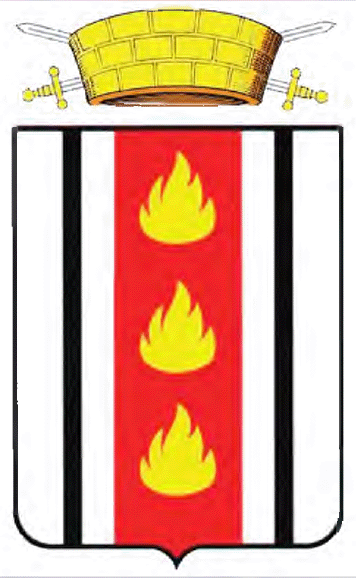
Coat of arms of Kolpino

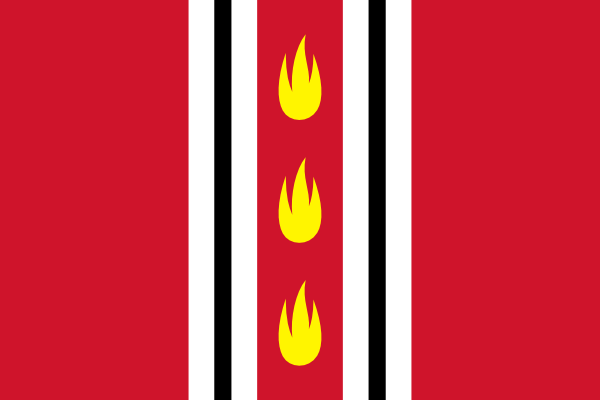
Flag of Kolpino

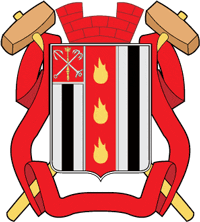
Old coat of arms of Kolpino (1881)

Kolpino (Russian: Ко́лпино) is a municipal city in Kolpinsky District of the federal city of St. Petersburg, Russia, located on the Izhora River (tributary of the Neva) 26 kilometers (16 mi) southeast of St. Petersburg proper. Population: 138,979 (2010 census); 136,632 (2002 census); 141,457 (1989 Soviet census); 81,000 (1972); 8,076 (1897).

== History ==
Kolpino was founded in 1722 and was granted town status in 1912. It was one of the chief ironworks of the crown in Russia. Kolpino was also home to an iron foundry of the Russian Admiralty. A sacred image of St. Nicholas in the Trinity Church is visited by numerous pilgrims on May 22 every year.

With the onset of World War II, Kolpino factory workers formed the Izhora Battalion, part of the militia, August 24 – September 4, 1941. The front line was held in the immediate vicinity of the plant, which was subjected to heavy enemy shelling. By 1944, only 327 of Kolpino's 2183 houses remained intact. 140,939 shells and 436 aerial bombs had fallen in Kolpino's neighborhoods and streets. According to incomplete data for the war, shelling and starvation in the Kolpino district killed 4,600 people, not counting the dead on the front. By January 1, 1944 Kolpino had only 2196 inhabitants. After the lifting of the siege, people gradually came back from the evacuation and from the army. On January 1, 1945 population was 7404, the beginning of next year – 8914 people.

During the construction of a new residential building, a mass grave was discovered in Kolpino. 888 soldiers and officers of the Red Army were buried in that mass grave in 1941.

== Economy and transportation ==
Many people of Kolpino work at Izhorian Plant. Kolpino District also contains many other plants.

Kolpino railway station has been in operation since 1847.

== Authorities ==
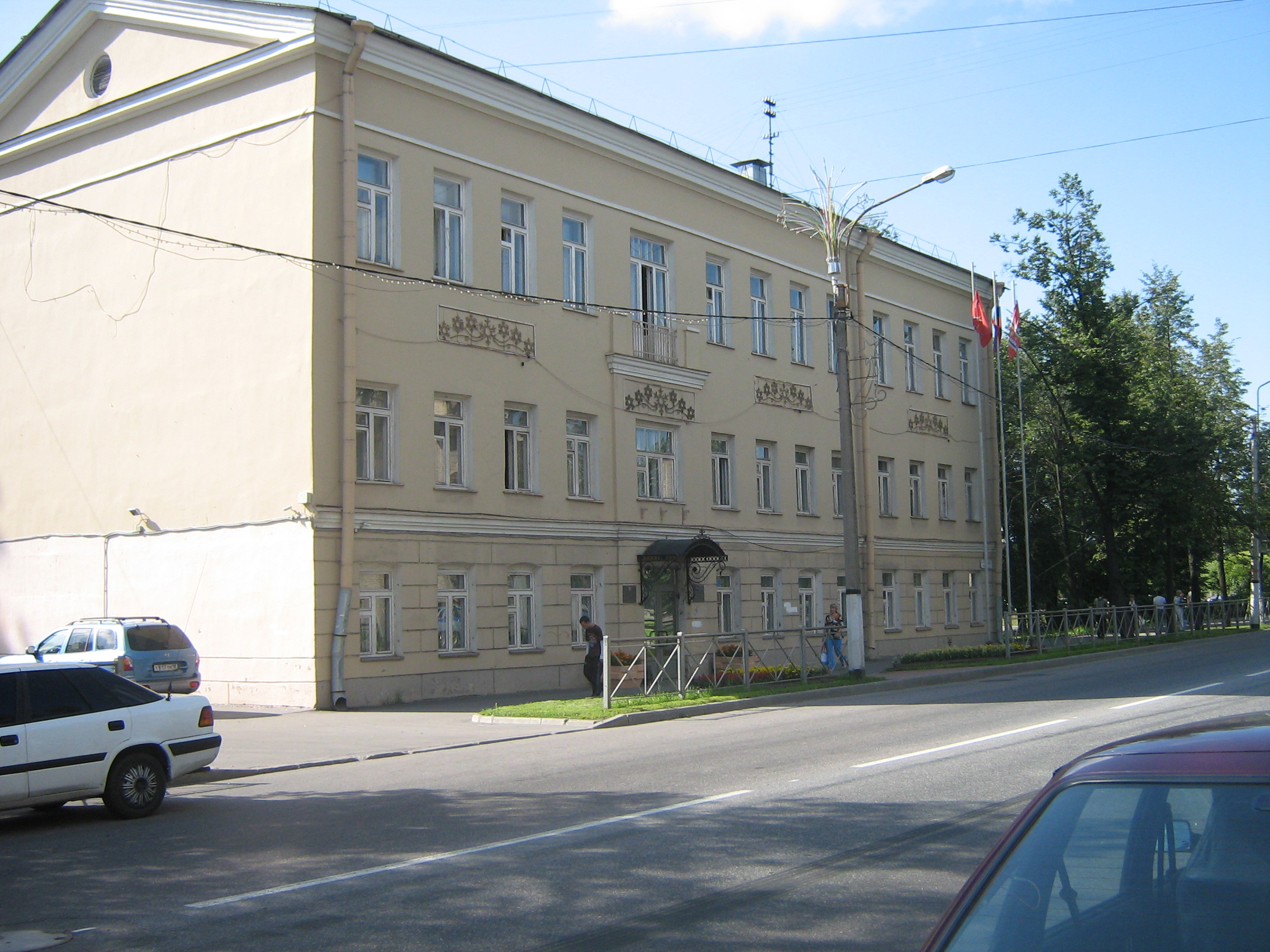
Kolpino City Council building

Of all 111 municipalities of St. Petersburg, Kolpinskoye is the largest. The history of local government began in 1881 when the Posad Duma appeared in Kolpino. The modern body of local government - the Municipal Council - has been operating since 1998. The council consists of 20 deputies. The current 6th convocation was elected in 2019. The council represents the following political forces: the United Russia party - 14 deputies; the A Just Russia party - two deputies; the Yabloko party - two deputies; and the Liberal Democratic Party of Russia - one deputy.

The administration of the Kolpinsky District is located in the town. The head of the district administration since April 2022 is Yulia Valerievna Logvinenko.

== International relations ==
=== Twin towns – Sister cities ===
Kolpino is twinned with:

- Druskininkai, Lithuania
- Huai'an, China
- Rauma, Finland
