= Russian destroyer Rastoropny (1988) =

Sovremenny-class destroyer of the Russian Navy

Coordinates: 59.9739782°N 29.7850527°E

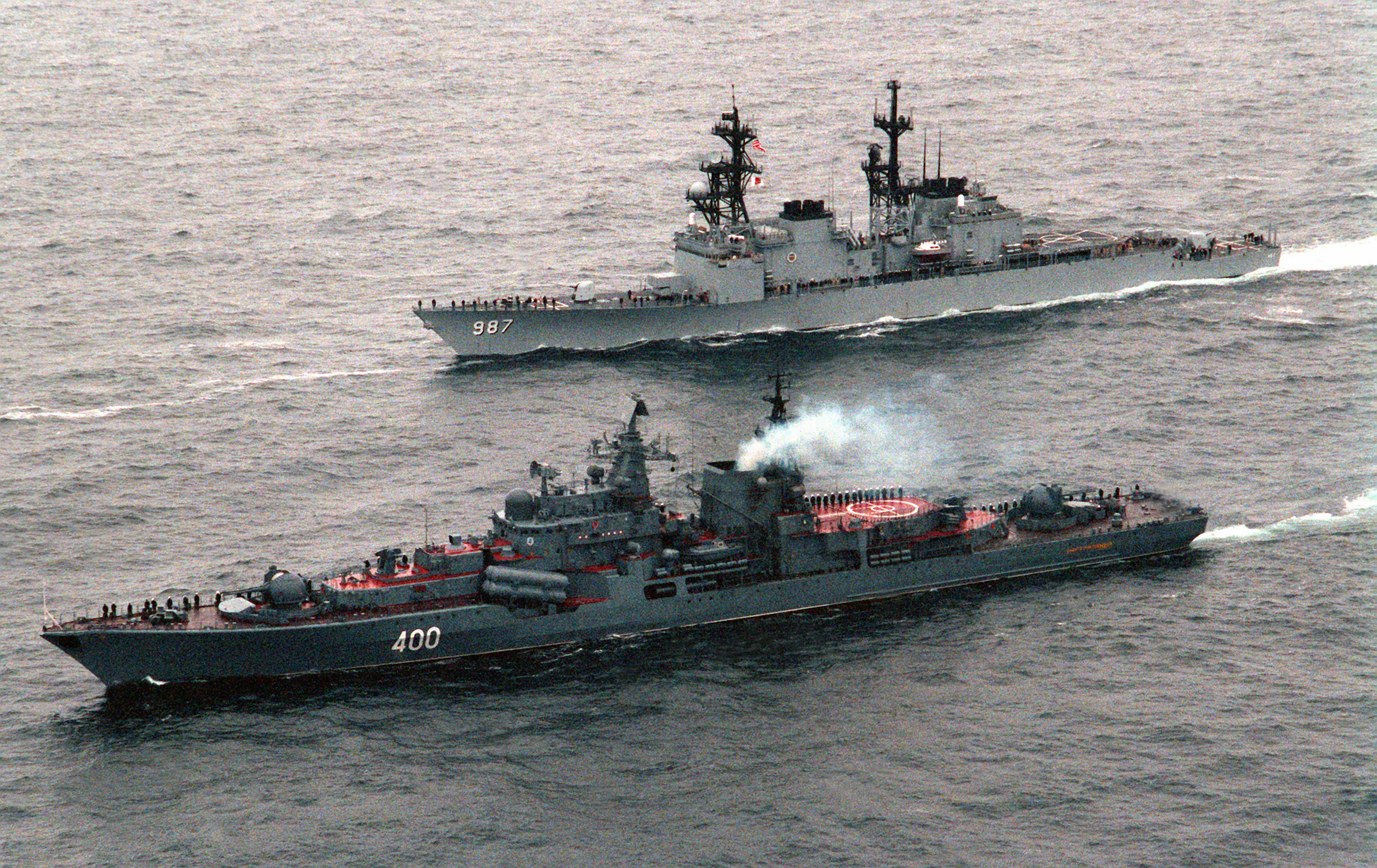
- Rastoropny underway with USS O'Bannon on 7 January 1992

History

Soviet Union → Russia
- Name: Rastoropny; (Расторопный)
- Namesake: Agile in Russian
- Builder: Zhdanov Shipyard, Leningrad
- Laid down: 15 August 1986
- Launched: 4 June 1988
- Commissioned: 30 December 1989
- Decommissioned: 8 August 2012
- Stricken: April 2016
- Home port: Kaliningrad
- Identification: Pennant number: 400, 420, 447, 633, 673
- Fate: Undergoing scrapping

General characteristics
- Class & type: Sovremenny-class destroyer
- Displacement: 6,600 tons standard, 8,480 tons full load
- Length: 156 m (511 ft 10 in)
- Beam: 17.3 m (56 ft 9 in)
- Draught: 6.5 m (21 ft 4 in)
- Propulsion: 2 shaft steam turbines, 4 boilers, 75,000 kW (100,000 hp), 2 fixed propellers, 2 turbo generators, and 2 diesel generators
- Speed: 32.7 knots (60.6 km/h; 37.6 mph)
- Range: 3,920 nmi (7,260 km; 4,510 mi) at 18 knots (33 km/h; 21 mph); 1,345 nmi (2,491 km; 1,548 mi) at 33 knots (61 km/h; 38 mph)
- Complement: 350
- Sensors & processing systems: Radar: Air target acquisition radar, 3 × navigation radars, 130 mm gun fire-control radars, 30 mm air-defence gun fire control radar; Sonar: Active and passive under-keel sonar; ES: Tactical situation plotting board, anti-ship missile fire control system, air defence, missile fire-control system, and torpedo fire control system
- Electronic warfare & decoys: 2 PK-2 decoy dispensers (200 rockets)
- Armament: Guns: 4 (2 × 2) AK-130 130 mm naval guns; 4 × 30 mm AK-630 CIWS; Missiles; 8 (2 × 4) (SS-N-22 'Sunburn') anti-ship missiles; 48 (2 × 24) SA-N-7 'Gadfly' surface-to-air missiles; Anti-submarine: 2 × 2 533 mm torpedo tubes; 2 × 6 RBU-1000 300 mm anti-submarine rocket launchers
- Aircraft carried: 1× Ka-27 series helicopter
- Aviation facilities: Helipad

Rastoropny was a Sovremenny-class destroyer of the Soviet and later Russian navy.

== Development and design ==
The project began in the late 1960s when it was becoming obvious to the Soviet Navy that naval guns still had an important role particularly in support of amphibious landings, but existing gun cruisers and destroyers were showing their age. A new design was started, employing a new 130 mm automatic gun turret.

The ships were 156 metres (512 ft) in length, with a beam of 17.3 metres (56 ft 9 in) and a draught of 6.5 metres (21 ft 4 in).

== Construction and career ==
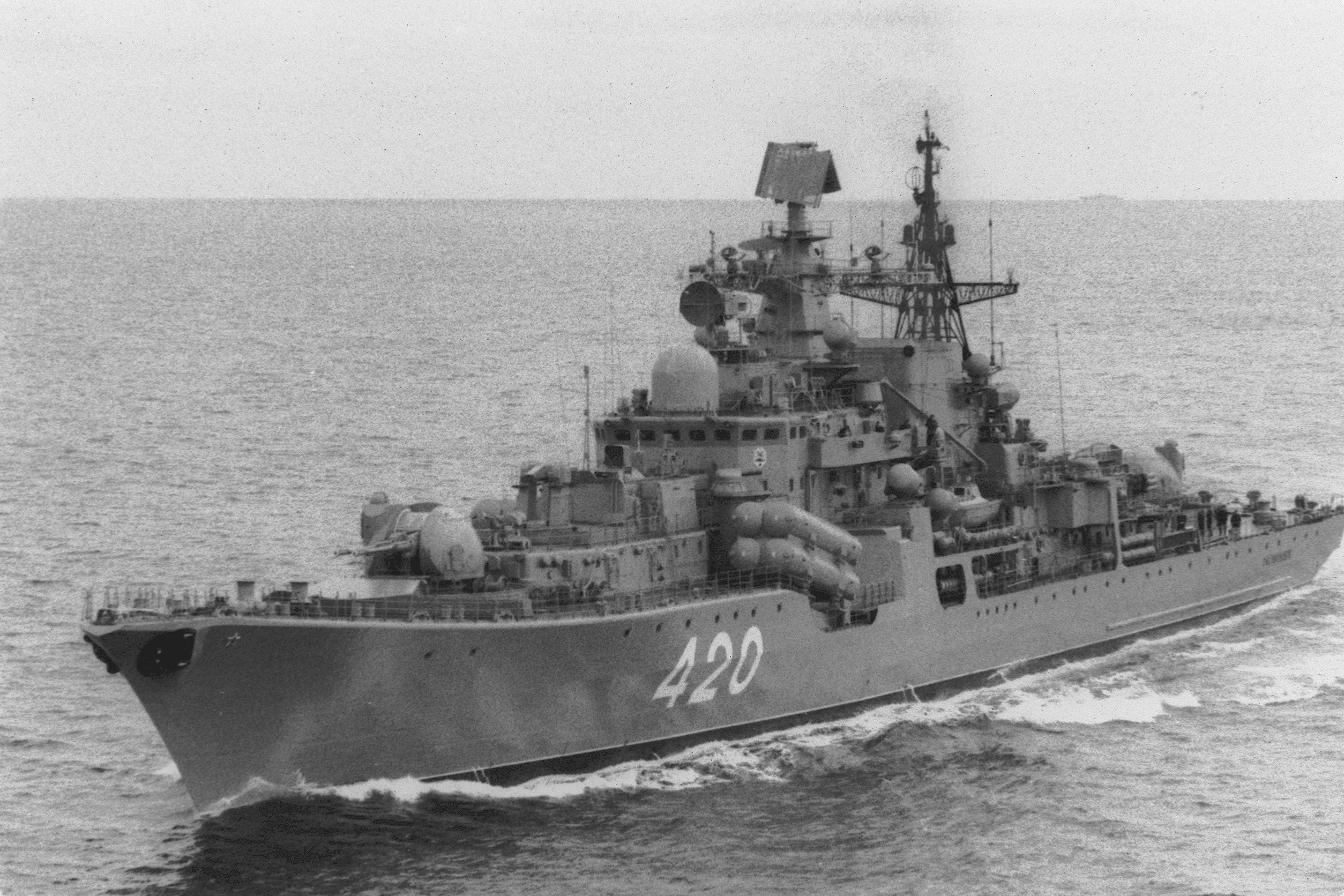
Rastoropny in 1994

Rastoropny was laid down on 15 August 1986 and launched on 4 June 1988 by Zhdanov Shipyard in Leningrad. She was commissioned on 30 December 1989.

She took part on April 16, 1997 in the command-staff exercises of the Northern Fleet without going to sea. The actions of the ship's crew were rated good. On December 31, 1997, she was transferred to category 2nd reserve.

On January 18, 1998 of the following year, ammunition was unloaded from her.

In October 2000, the ship made an inter-fleet transition from the main base of the Northern Fleet of Severomorsk to Saint Petersburg to undergo medium repairs and modernization. Due to the lack of funding since 2000, the ship was laid up at JSC Shipbuilding Plant Severnaya Verf.

On September 16, 2014, she left Severnaya Verf and was transferred to Kronstadt under tow.

On June 22, 2015, it was announced that she was to be scrapped, and by September 9 of the same year, the process had begun with the removal of her gun turrets.

In April 2016, the Russian Ministry of Defence officially requested bids for a contract for the scrapping of Rastoropny along with seven other naval vessels.
