= Sredne-Nevsky Shipyard =

Coordinates: 59.7889°N 30.6299°E

Sredne-Nevskiy Shipyard

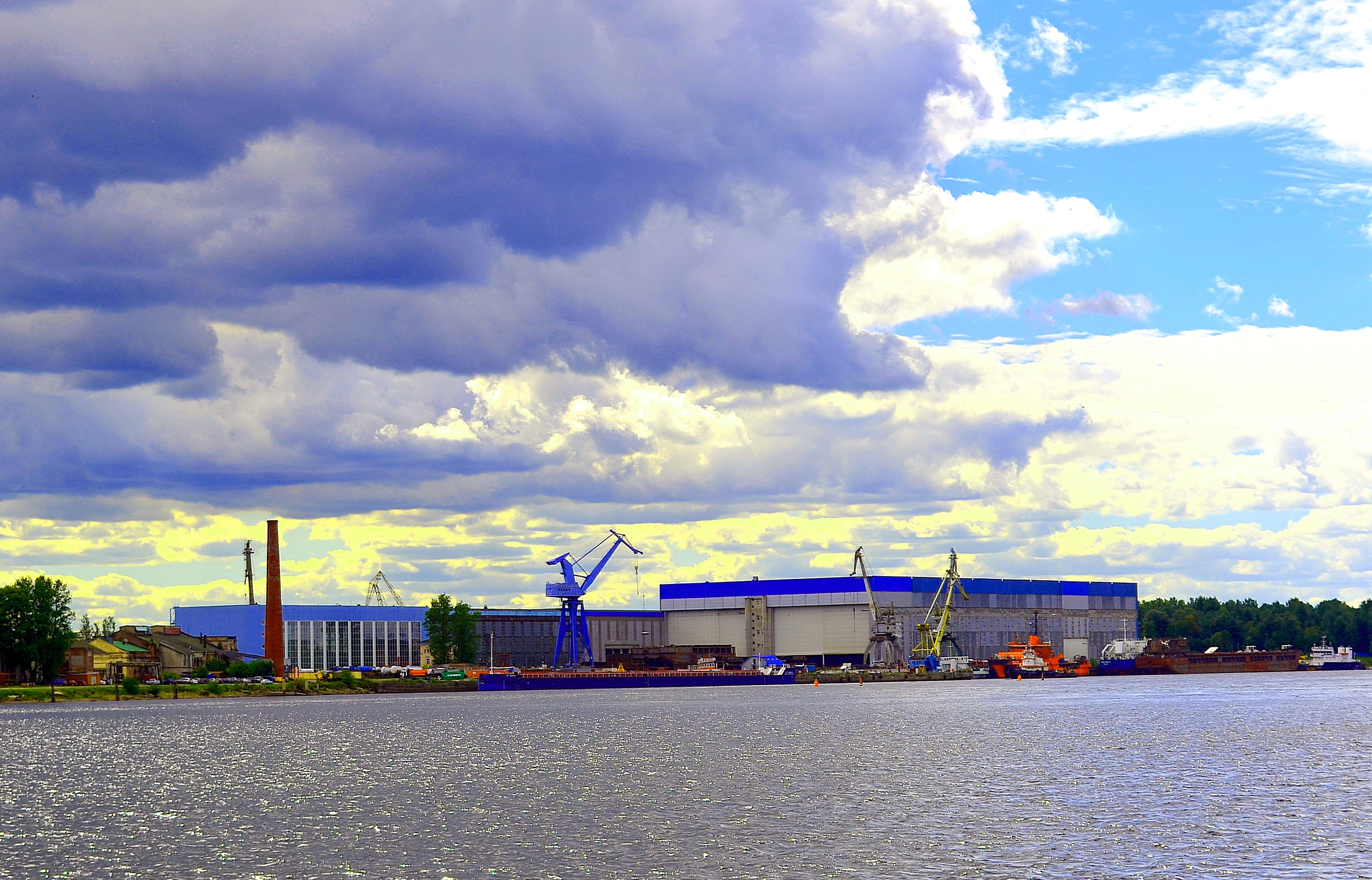
- Company type: Joint-stock company
- Industry: Shipbuilding
- Founded: 1912
- Headquarters: Pontonnyy, dist. of Kolpino, Saint Petersburg, Russia
- Parent: United Shipbuilding Corporation
- Website: snsz.ru

The Middle Neva Shipbuilding Plant (Russian: Средне-Невский судостроительный завод, romanized: Sredne-Nevskiy sudostroitelnyy zavod) was founded before the end of the 19th century in Saint Petersburg, Russia. In 1917 it employed 17,000 people. It established a branch in Nikolaev in the early years of the 20th century to assemble ships which had been built in St. Petersburg and transported to the Black Sea. It is part of the United Shipbuilding Corporation.

== History ==
The Middle Neva shipyard, located near the junction of the Izhora and Neva rivers in the Kolpino district of southern St. Petersburg, is an important builder of mine warfare ships for the Russian navy. The yard probably dates back to 1911, when the Petersburg Metals Plant, then a builder of marine turbines, established a shipyard at Ust-Izhora to build destroyers.

Between the world wars the Ust-Izhora yard was limited to the construction of river barges. It was expanded into a major builder of minesweepers and other small combatants after World War II and built ships of the steel-hulled T-43, T-58, Yurka, and Natya classes in the 1950s and 1960s. It has also built a few large tugs and small tankers for service as naval auxiliaries.

Around 1970 it began to experiment with glass-reinforced plastic and subsequently built a few Zhenya-class minesweepers and many Yevgenya- and Lida-class inshore minesweepers. It also built hydrofoils of the Matka and Turya classes and Tarantul-class missile corvettes.

Today it is offering several types of ships on the civil market similar to its minesweeper classes, including ships of up to 100 tons with glass-reinforced plastic hulls, steel-hulled ships of up to 800 tons, and similar ships built with low-magnetic steel.

== Bibliography ==
- Breyer, Siegfried (1992). Soviet Warship Development: Volume 1: 1917–1937. London: Conway Maritime Press. ISBN 0-85177-604-3.
