= Ust-Izhora =

Municipality in the Kolpinsky district of St. Petersburg, Russia

Coordinates: 59°48′07″N 30°36′14″E

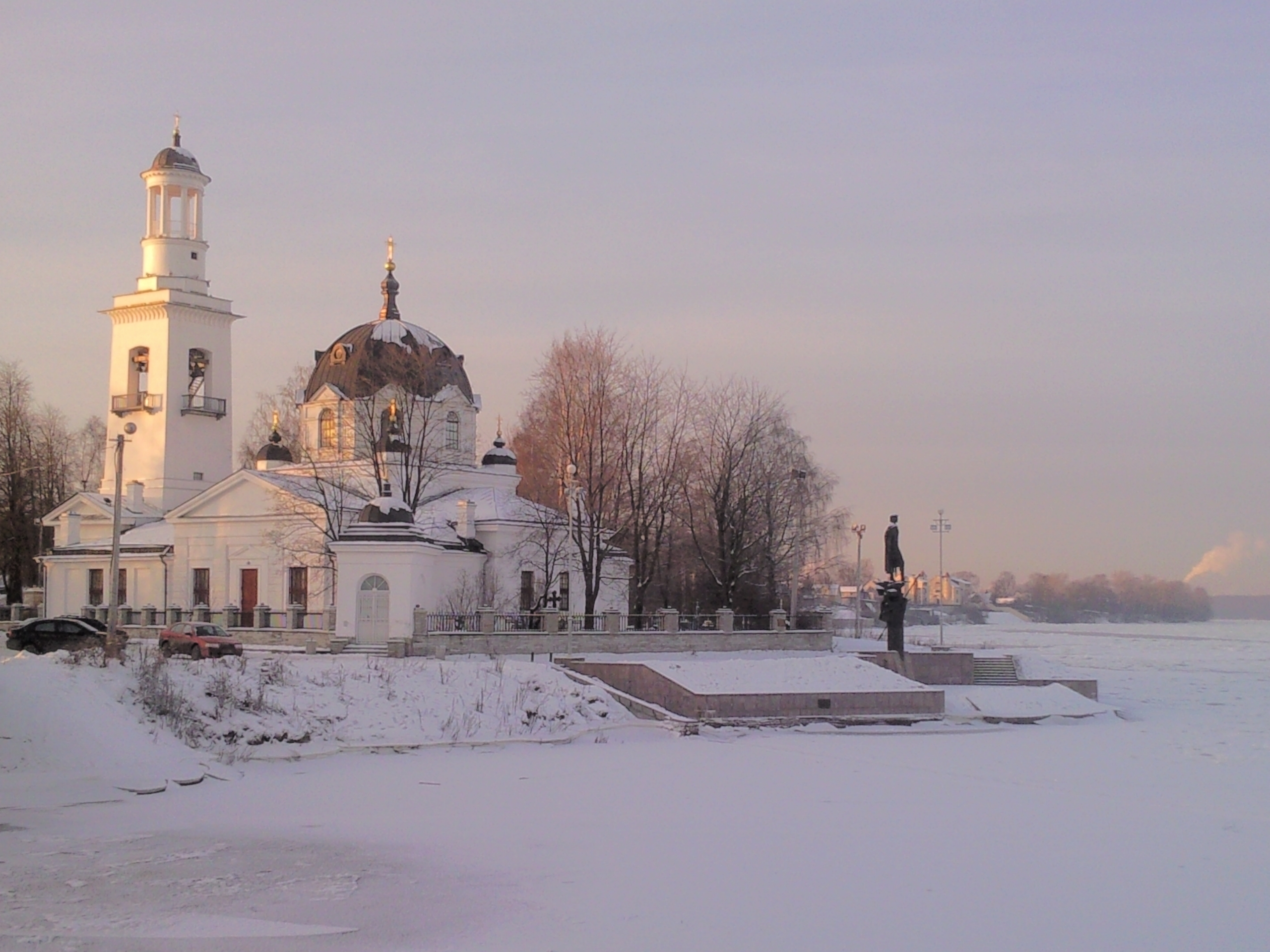
Alexander Nevsky Church on the Neva River in Ust-Izhora

Ust-Izhora (Russian: Усть-Ижо́ра) is a municipal settlement in Kolpinsky District of the federal city of St. Petersburg, Russia, situated at the confluence of the Izhora and Neva Rivers, and is roughly equidistant to St. Petersburg and Shlisselburg, Russia, 30 kilometers (19 mi) from both the Gulf of Finland in the west and Lake Ladoga in the northeast. Population: 1,354 (2010 census); 1,152 (2002 census); 1,378 (1989 Soviet census).

The settlement is believed to mark the location of the Battle of the Neva (July 15, 1240), when weak forces led by Prince Alexander Yaroslavich of Novgorod defeated the Swedes here, and prevented them from advancing farther south into Ingria. The chronicles tell of a "great battle," in which Alexander's men stormed and sank three Swedish ships, and Alexander himself wounded Birger, the Swedish commander.

Following this victory on the Neva, the prince was renamed Alexander Nevsky. The Russian Orthodox Church eventually canonized him, and he is now the patron saint of Saint Petersburg. A church was built on the bank of the Neva in 1799 to commemorate the famous battle. Close by the church are two monuments honoring Alexander Nevsky, in whose memory the church is dedicated.
