= Tsarskoye Selo railway station =

Railway station in Saint Petersburg, Russia

Tsarskoye Selo Царское Село
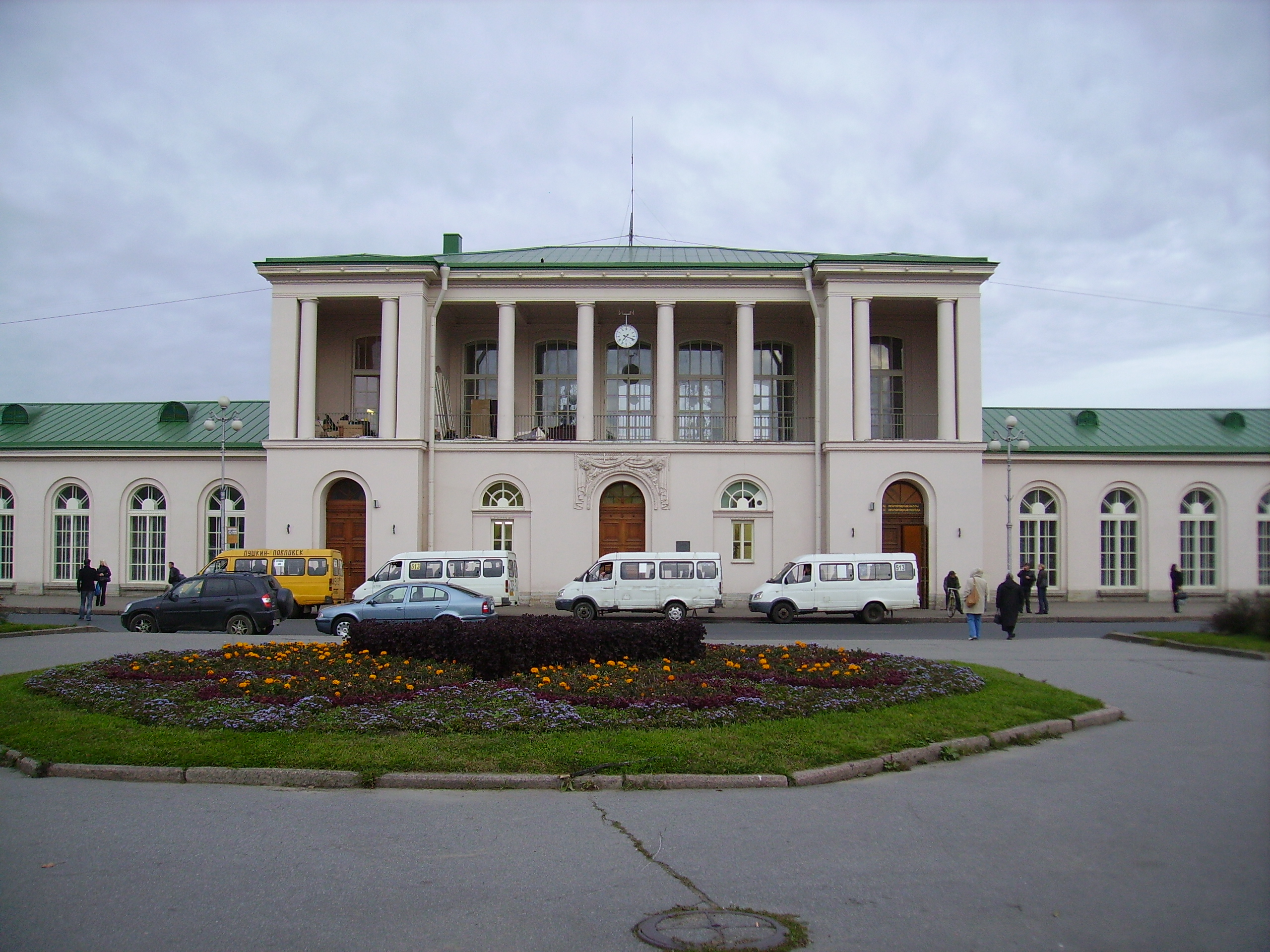
- View of the station

General information
- Location: 1, Privokzalnaya Sqr, Pushkinsky District Saint Petersburg, Russia
- Coordinates: 59.72278°N 30.429440°E
- Platforms: 2
- Tracks: 5

Construction
- Parking: yes

Other information
- Station code: 032707

History
- Opened: 1838
- Rebuilt: 1904, 1950
- Former names: Tsarskoye Selo (until 1918), Detskoye Selo (1918–2013)
Location

Tsarskoye Selo railway station (Russian: станция Царское Село) is a railway station located in Pushkin, Saint Petersburg, Russia. It is 23 km down-line from Vitebsky railway station and is situated between Shushary and Pavlovsk on the Saint Petersburg – Vitebsk line. The station hosts suburban trains from Saint-Petersburg, Novolisino, Posyolok, Oredezh, Luga and Veliky Novgorod. Electric trains ED4M, ER2T and DT1 make passenger trips from Tsarskoye Selo station. Long-distance trains do not stop at Tsarskoye Selo station except for trains from Velikiye Luki. The station is approximately 1 km from the town center. It has official status as an object of Russian cultural heritage.

== History ==
The Tsarkoe Selo station was opened on 22 May 1838 with the construction of Russia's first Tsarskoye Selo Railway from Saint-Petersburg to Pavlovsk. Construction began in May 1836, and the first test trips were carried out the same year between Tsarskoye Selo and Pavlovsk, using horse-drawn trains. The first station building was built according to the project of Swiss architect Gaspare Fossati. The building was designed in the English Gothic style. It was a two-story brick building with a quadrangular tower and two side one-storey wooden phases. Awnings were installed to the side phases, leaning on cast-iron pillars and wrought-iron curly arms.

In 1902–1904, a new project was realized on the site of the old building by a group of architects under the leadership of S. A. Brzhozovsky. Symmetrical building was designed in the late eclecticism style of Western Europe. To the left of the station, the Grand Princely Pavilion was built. Both landmarks were destroyed during the Soviet era. After the October Revolution of 1917, Tsarskoye Selo station was renamed to Detskoye Selo several months later.

The third station building was built from 1946 to 1950 based on the project of the Leningrad architect Evgeny Levinson and engineer Andrey Grushke. Their project was given the Stalin Prize. The station complex includes the main two-story buildings and three pavilions. In the pavilions, there are descents in tunnels under railway tracks. The general composition is designed in strict classical forms, which are typical for Pushkin's architecture. The design of the facades and interiors reflects the connection of the city with the biography and works of Russian poet Alexander Pushkin. The facade of the main building is decorated with medallions and bas-relief portraits of teachers and friends of the poet such as Gavriil Derzhavin, Nikolai Karamzin, Vasiliy Zhukovsky, Anton Delvig, Pyotor Chaadayev, Wilhelm Küchelbecker. A bronze sculpture of Alexander Pushkin by the sculptor Matvey Manizer was installed in the waiting room. Divided by two rows of columns A, plafond of the hall is decorated with panels depicting the constructions of the Tsarskoye Selo parks. The booking hall is decorated with paintings in the form of trees with widely spaced branches. Bas-reliefs with a profile portrait of Alexander Pushkin are placed on the walls. Overdoors, iron chandeliers, white matte and blue glass complement the decoration of the hall.

During the Soviet times, from 1932 to the mid-1960s, a dedicated railroad line existed between Detskoe Selo station and Kolpino railway station in neighboring industrial Kolpino city. Line had one stop in the middle, and its main purpose was transportation of workers to Kolpino's Izhorskiye Zavody industrial complex. The line was temporarily dismantled during the Great Patriotic War.

Tsarskoye Selo station was electrified DC and equipped with automatic train protection in 1953. On 6 August 2013, the original name, Tsarskoye Selo, was restored.

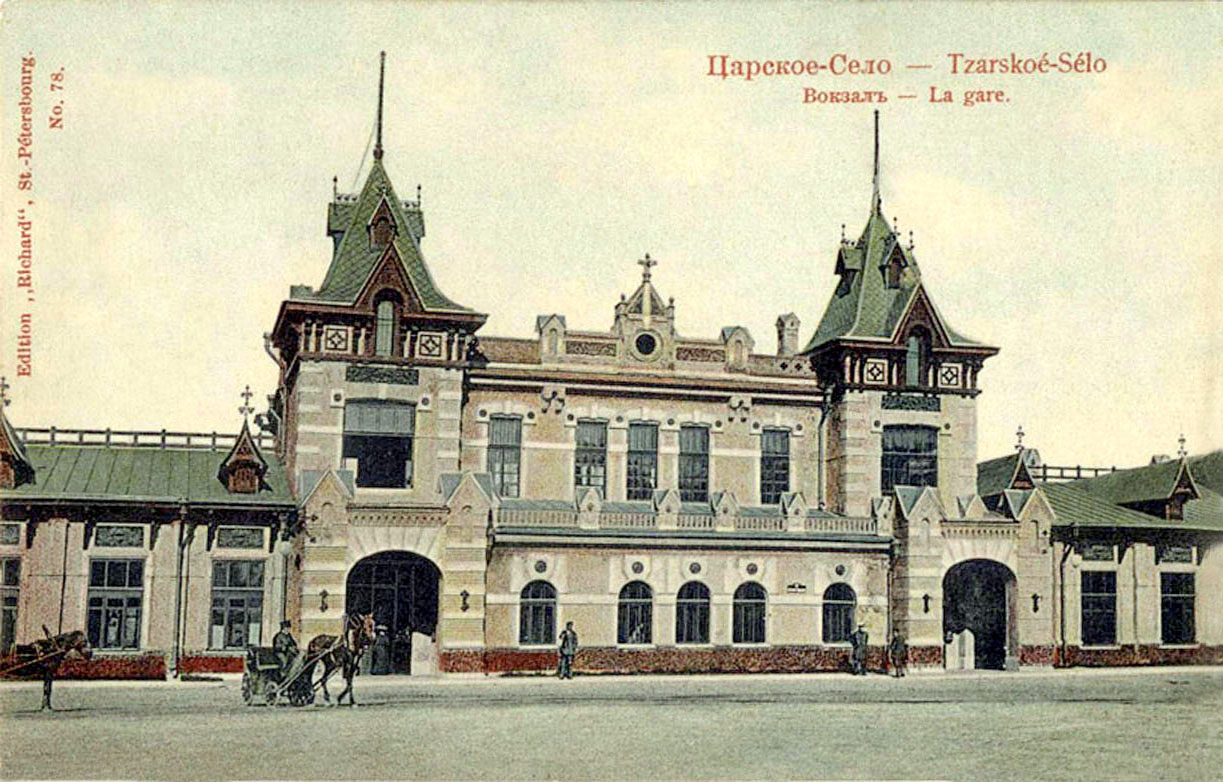
Tsarskoye Selo in the 1910s

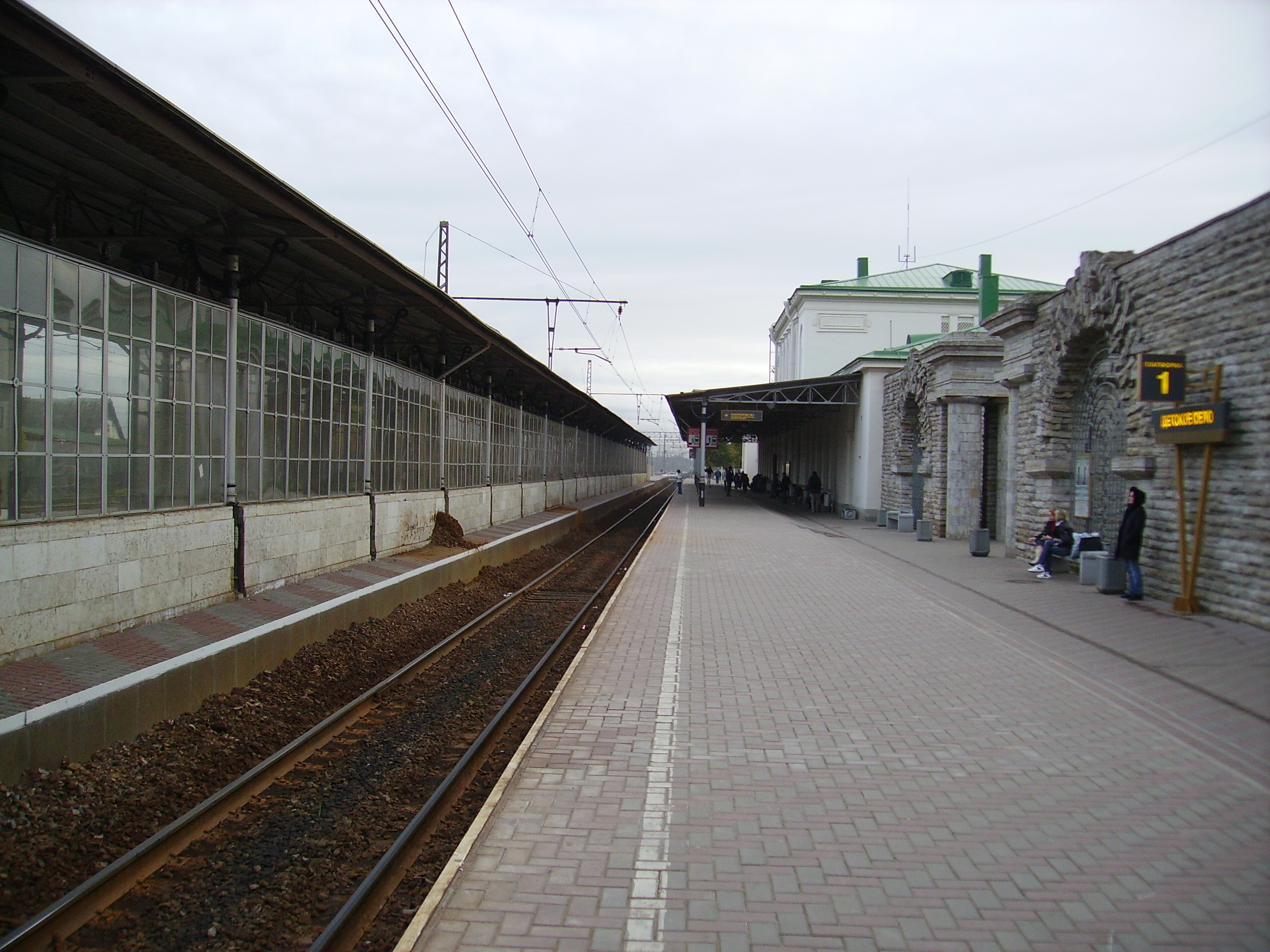
Platform

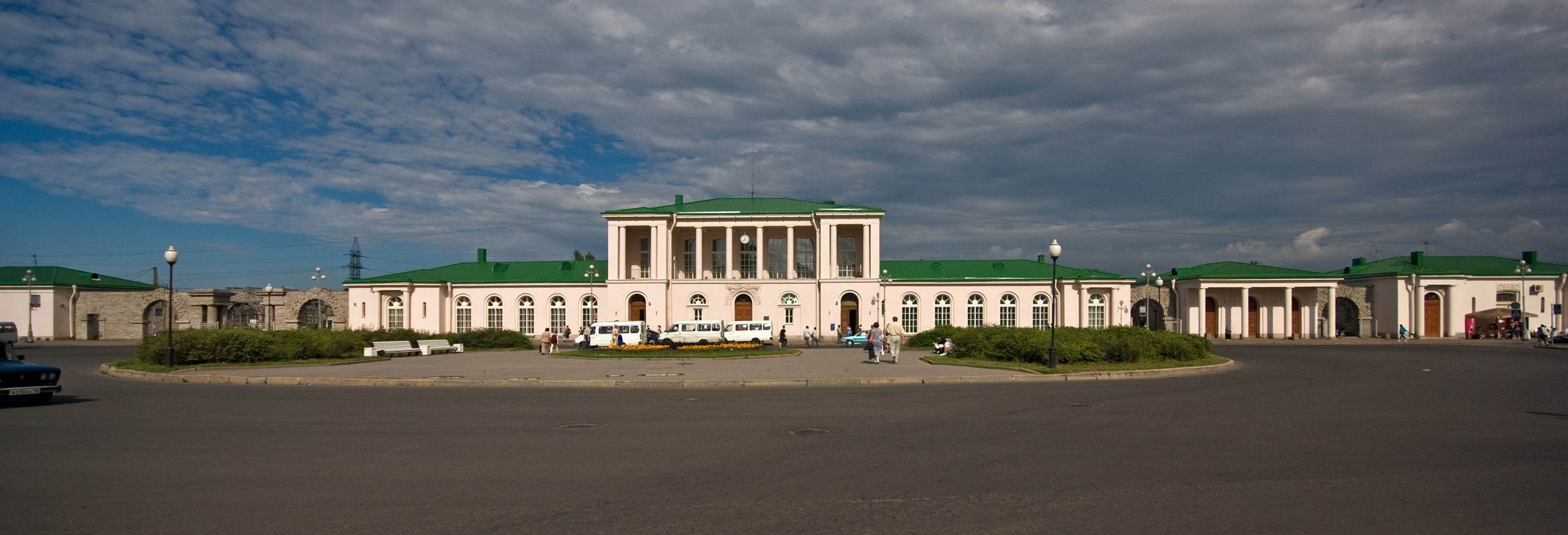
View of the station from Privokzalnaya Square

== See also ==
- Imperatorsky pavilyon railway station
