= Pavlovsk railway station =

Railway station in Saint Petersburg, Russia

Pavlovsk Павловск
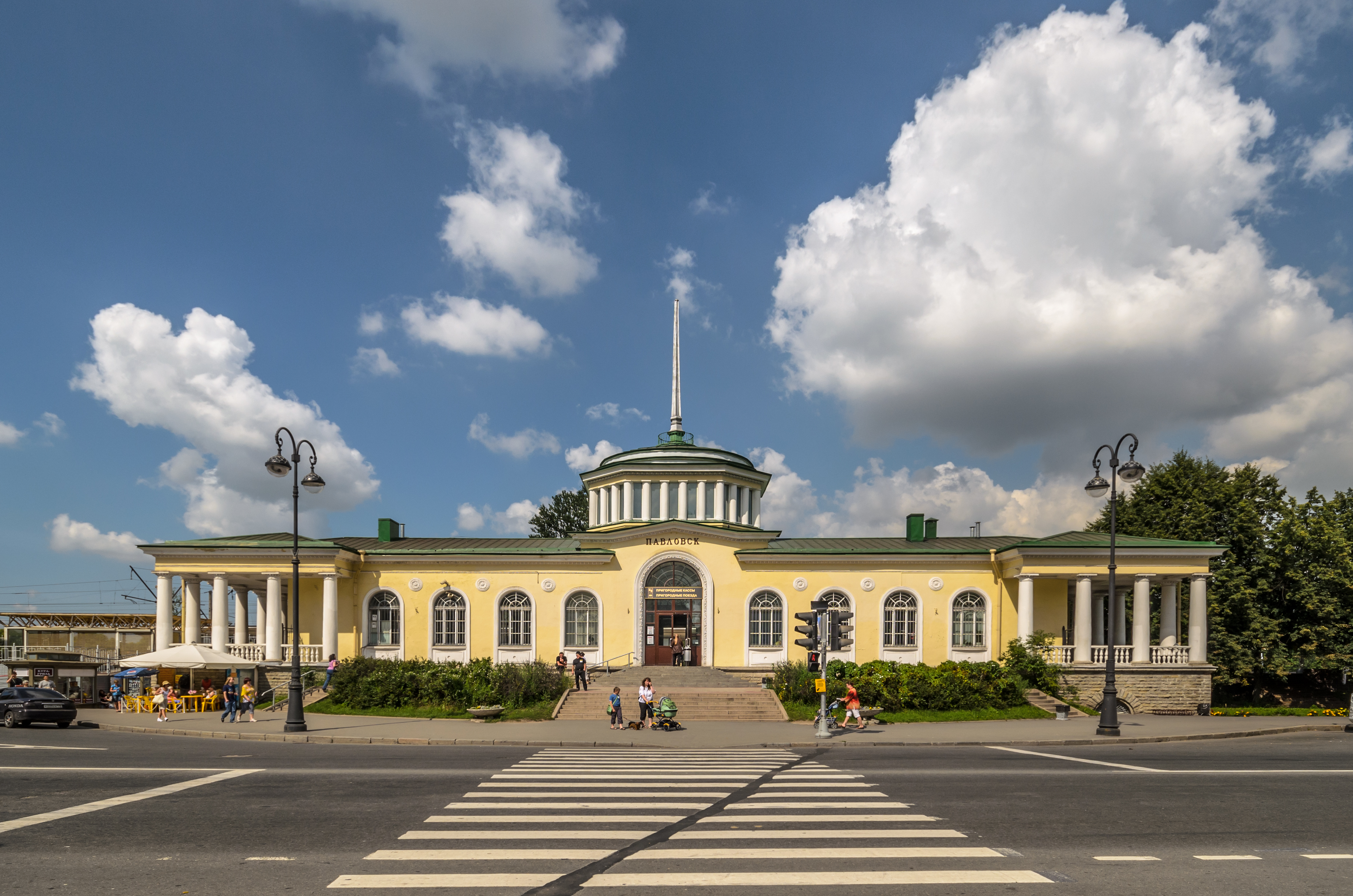
- View of the station

General information
- Location: 1, Privokzalnaya Sqr, Pavlovsk, Pushkinsky District Saint Petersburg, Russia
- Coordinates: 59.693396°N 30.433243°E
- Platforms: 2
- Tracks: 5

Construction
- Parking: yes

Other information
- Station code: 0325087

History
- Opened: 1838
- Rebuilt: 1860, 1871, 1884, 1955
Location

Pavlovsk railway station (Russian: станция Павловск) is a railway station located in Pavlovsk, Pushkinsky District of Saint Petersburg, Russia. It is 26 km down-line from Vitebsky railway station and is situated between Tsarskoye Selo and Antropshino on the Saint Petersburg — Vitebsk line. Also it combines route out of Novolisino and Tosno on the Saint Petersburg — Moscow line. The station hosts suburban trains from Saint-Petersburg, Novolisino, Posyolok, Oredezh, Luga and Veliky Novgorod. Electric trains ED4M, ER2T, DT1 and railbus RA2 make a passenger trips from Pavlovsk. Long-distance trains have not stop at Pavlovsk station. The station is approximately 1,4 km from the town center. It has official status as an object of Russian cultural heritage.

== History ==
Pavlovsk station was opened on 23 May 1838 with the construction of the first in Russian Empire Tsarskoye Selo Railway from Saint-Petersburg to Pavlovsk. Construction began in May 1836, and the first test trips were carried out the same year between Tsarskoye Selo and Pavlovsk, using horse-drawn trains. The first station building was built according to the project of Italian architect Andrei Stackenschneider. Pavlovsk was terminal station for the Tsarskoye Selo Railway. To attract passengers Franz von Gerstner proposed to equip a music hall at the Pavlovsk station. The station and music hall worked only in the summer, because of the low passenger traffic for the winter. The Tsarskoye Selo railway was closed for the winter.

Pavlovsk railway station was one of the first permanent music venue in Russia, in which symphony orchestras performed. In September 1838, Gypsy chorus performed, then the symphony orchestra conducted by Joseph German performed in early next year, and from 1856 Johann Strauss II performed for ten seasons. The outstanding musicians Alexander Glazunov, Reinhold Glière, A. K. Lyadov, N. A. Malko, V. I. Suk, Leonid Sobinov, Nikilai Figner, Medea Figner, Ivan Yershov, Anastasia Vyaltseva, Henryk Wieniawski, Sergei Prokofiev and others performed at Pavlovsk music hall.

In 1844 the building suffered a fire, but was restored soon. From 1860 to 1884 the station was rebuilt three times and expanded. In 1898 Pavlovsk railway station has become part of the private Moscow-Vindava-Rybinsk railway. The station building was destroyed during the Second World War.

The current station building was built 60 meters north of the old building in 1955. It was designed by the architect Evgeny Levinson, who revived the palace and park ensembles of Pushkin and Pavlovsk. This is a one-story building with side porticos and a hexagonal rotunda with a spire in the central part. Earlier, until 1994, it was crowned by a star, but because of its dilapidation it was dismantled.

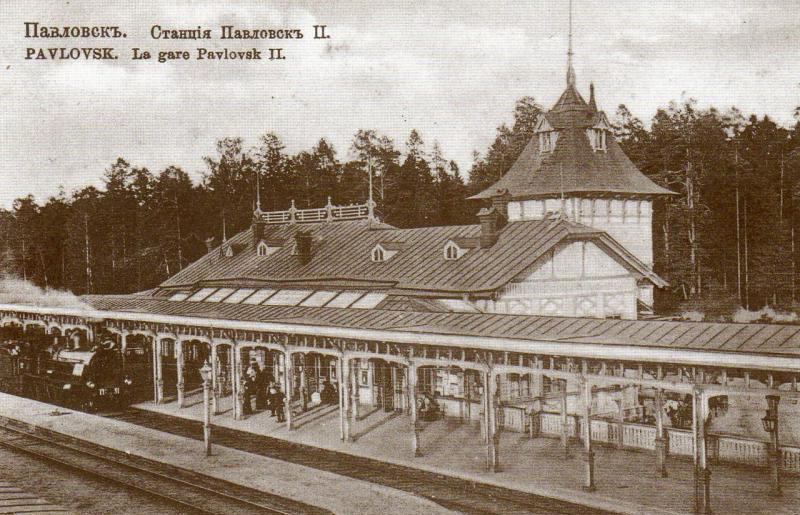
Pavlovsk-II station in 1915

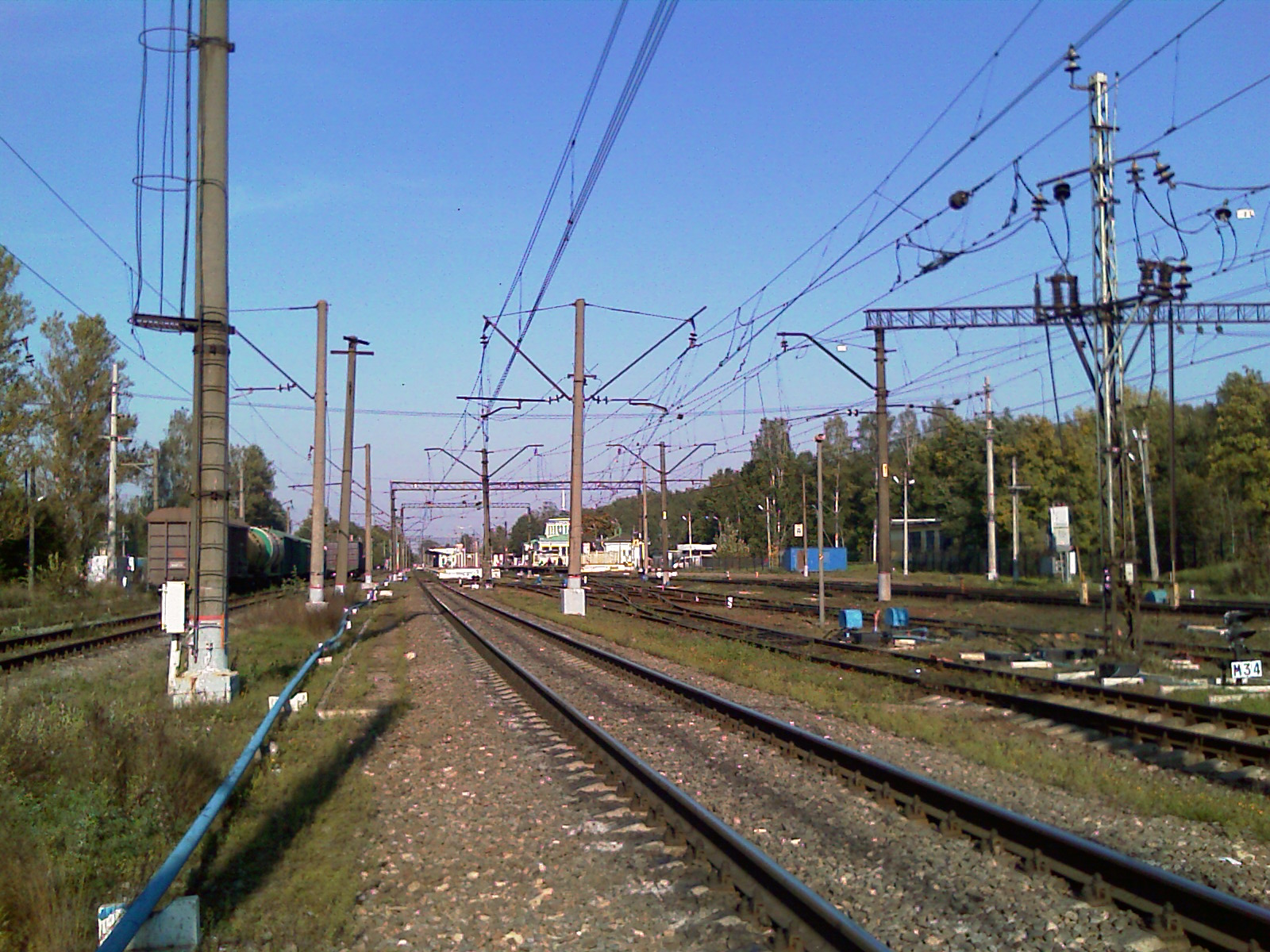
Gridiron of tracks

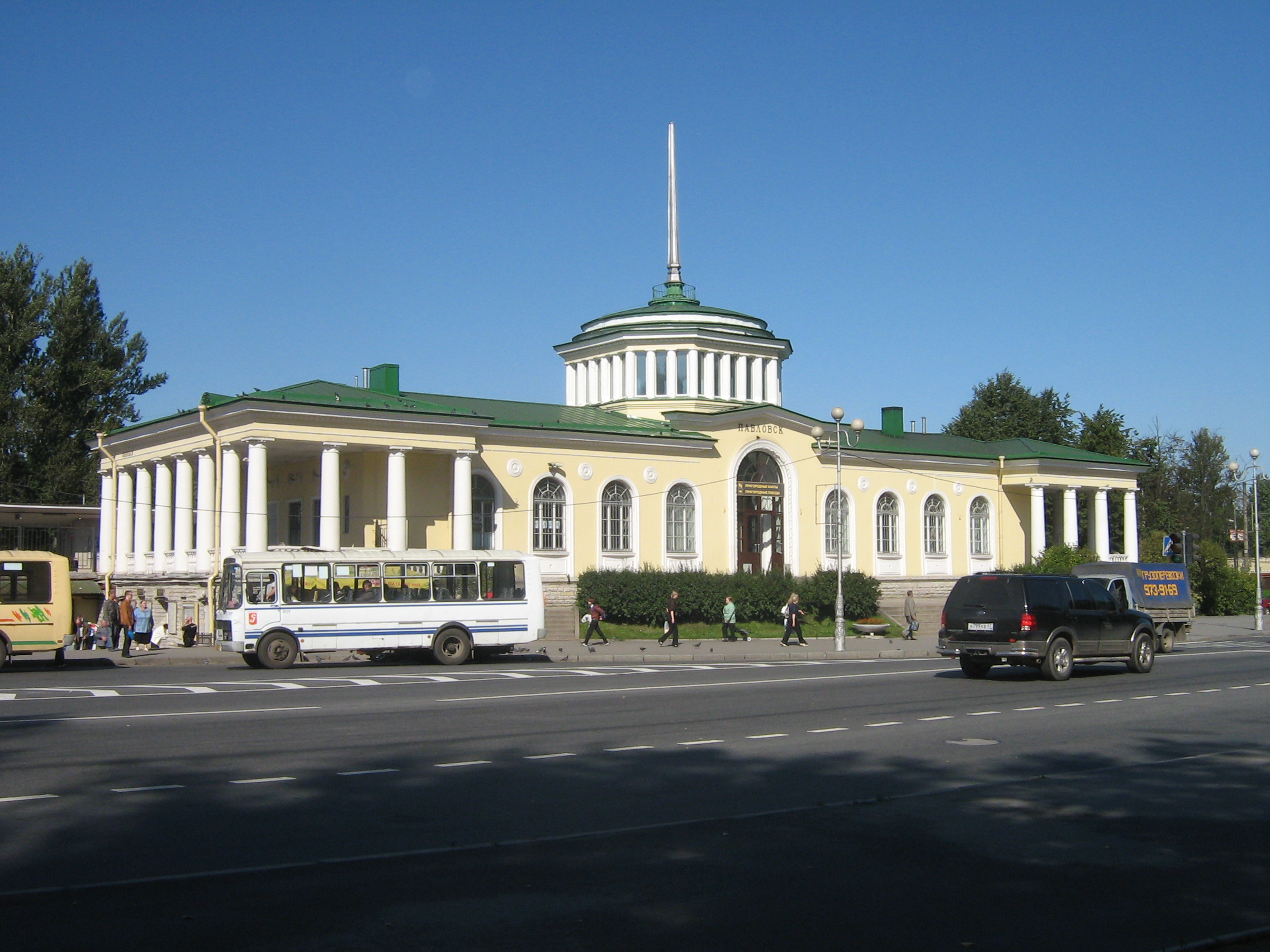
View of the station from Privokzalnaya Sqr
