= Kolpino railway station =

Railway station in Saint Petersburg, Russia

Kolpino Колпино
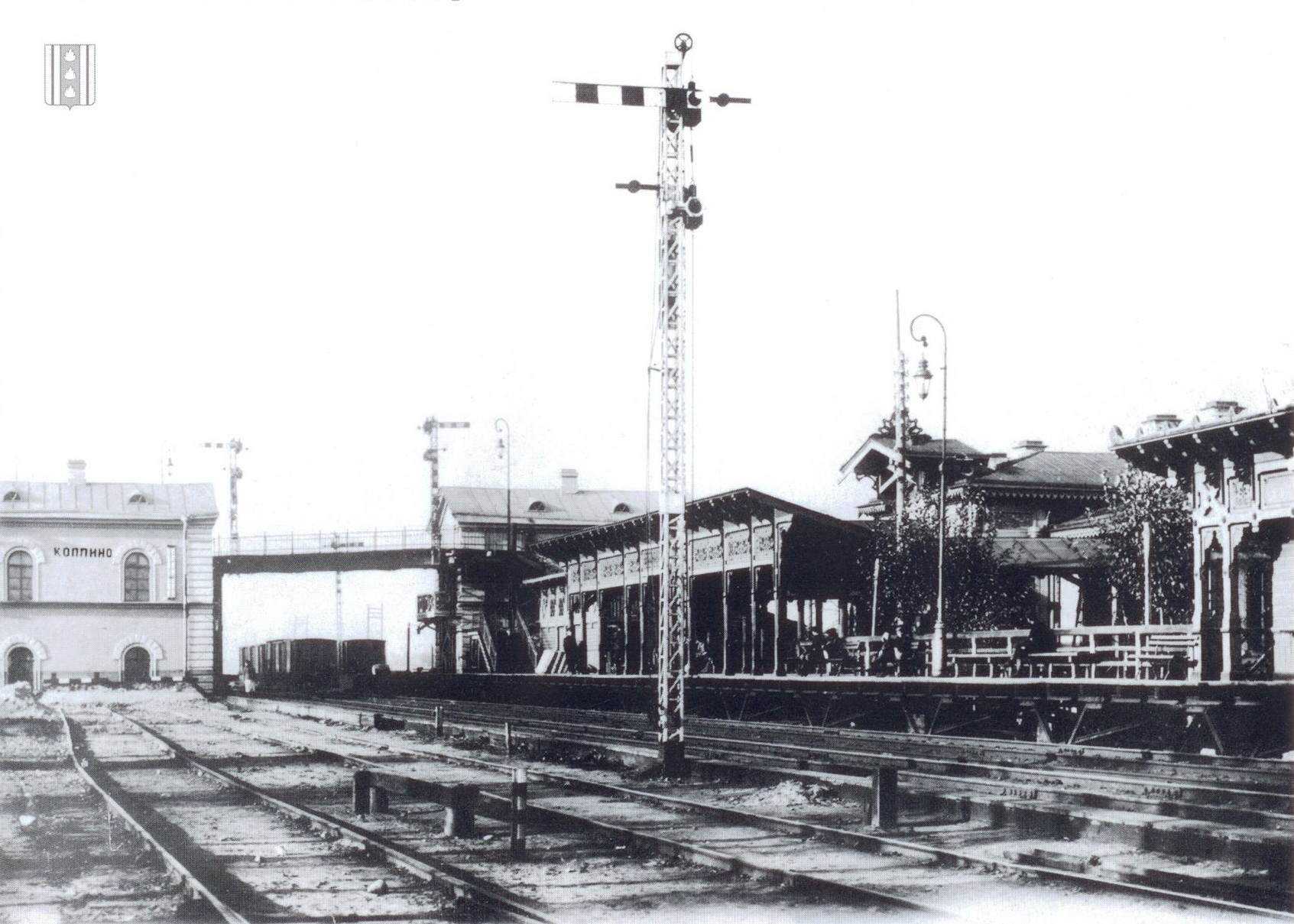
- View of the station in the 1910s

General information
- Location: 1, Privokzalnaya Sqr, Kolpino, Kolpinsky District Saint Petersburg, Russia
- Coordinates: 59.749619°N 30.614275°E
- Platforms: 2
- Tracks: 4

Construction
- Parking: yes

Other information
- Station code: 031600

History
- Opened: 1847
- Rebuilt: 1955
- Former names: Kolpinskaya
Location

Kolpino railway station (Russian: станция Колпино) is a railway station located in self-named city, Kolpinsky District of Saint Petersburg, Russia. It is 24 km down-line from Moskovsky railway station and is situated between Sankt-Peterburg-Moskovsky-Sortirovochny (Obukhovo team tracks) and Sablino on the Saint Petersburg — Moscow line. The station hosts suburban trains from Saint-Petersburg, Malaya Vishera, Shapki and Veliky Novgorod. Electric trains Lastochka ES1, ED4M, ET2M and ER2T make a passenger trips from Kolpino. Long-distance trains have not stop at Kolpino station. The station is approximately 1,2 km from the town center.

== History ==
Kolpino station was opened on 9 May 1843 with the construction of the first in Russian Empire double tracked Saint Petersburg–Moscow Railway. The first station building was one-storey and wooden. The station was rebuilt in the early 1890s and was reopened on 1 September 1893. The central part was decorated with wood carving. There were extensions, which housed the First Class and Second Class waiting rooms and the station-master's office. Telegraph station occupied one of the rooms.

The station building was destroyed during the Second World War. The plan for the construction of the post-war Kolpino, including the railway station, was developed in Lenniyiproekt. The project of the station ensemble was created in the workshop of the architect M. Klimentov in 1949. The ensemble of Privokzalnaya Square designed by Klimentov was not fully realized. The new station building was not built because of enacted resolution "On the elimination of excesses in design and construction" not long after the death of Stalin in 1953. Instead of the planned construction a small one-storeyed wooden station-house was built. By the beginning of the 1990s two stone buildings on both sides of the railway tracks with ticket offices, waiting room and toilet were erected. During the last reconstruction they were dismantled.

In USSR times, from 1932 to mid 1960s, a dedicated railroad line existed between Kolpino station and Detskoe Selo station in neighboring historical Pushkin town. Line had one stop in the middle, and its main purpose was transportation of workers to Kolpino's Izhorskiye Zavody industrial complex. The line was temporarily dismantled during Great Patriotic War.

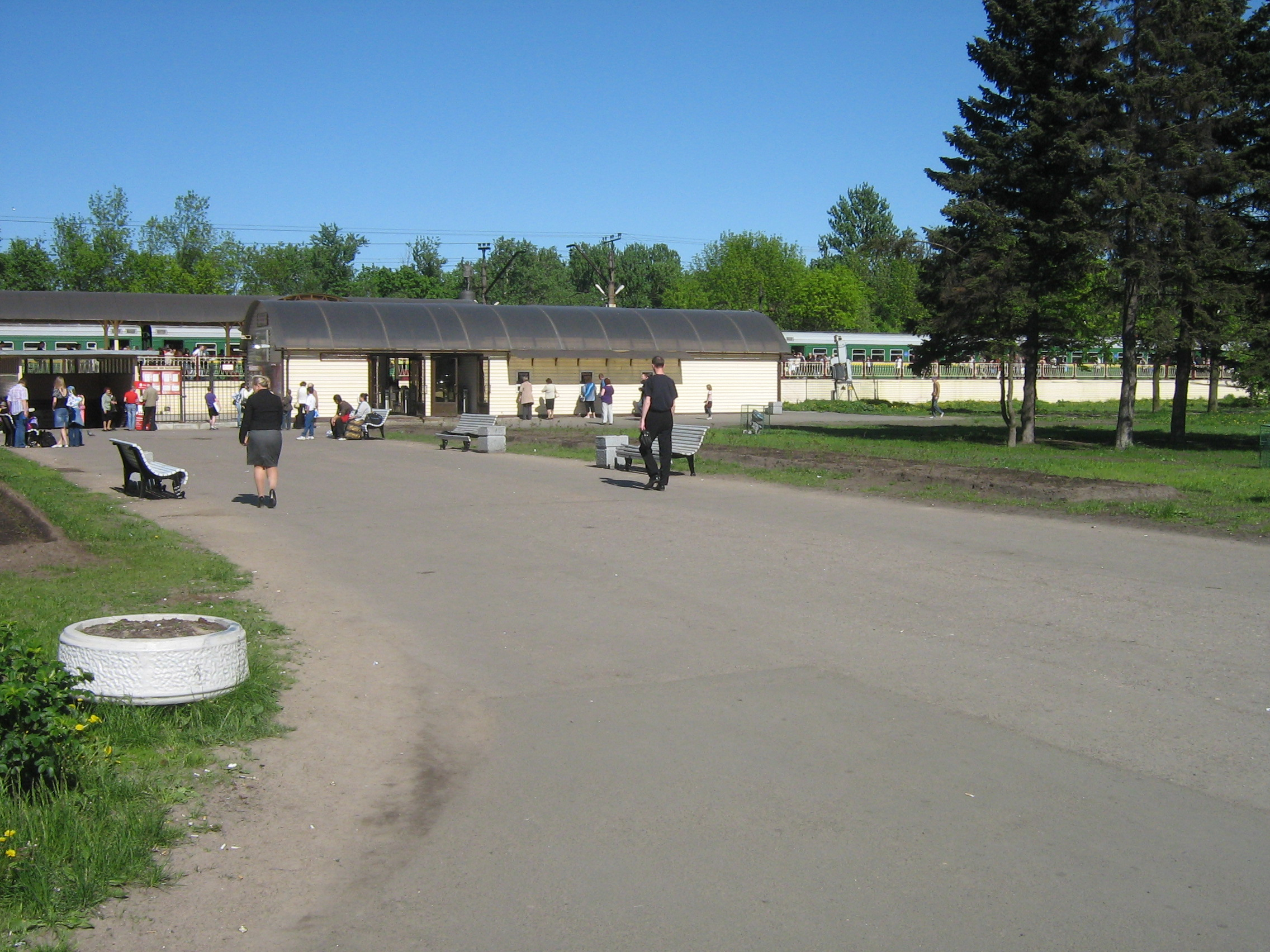
View of the station from Privokzalnaya Sqr

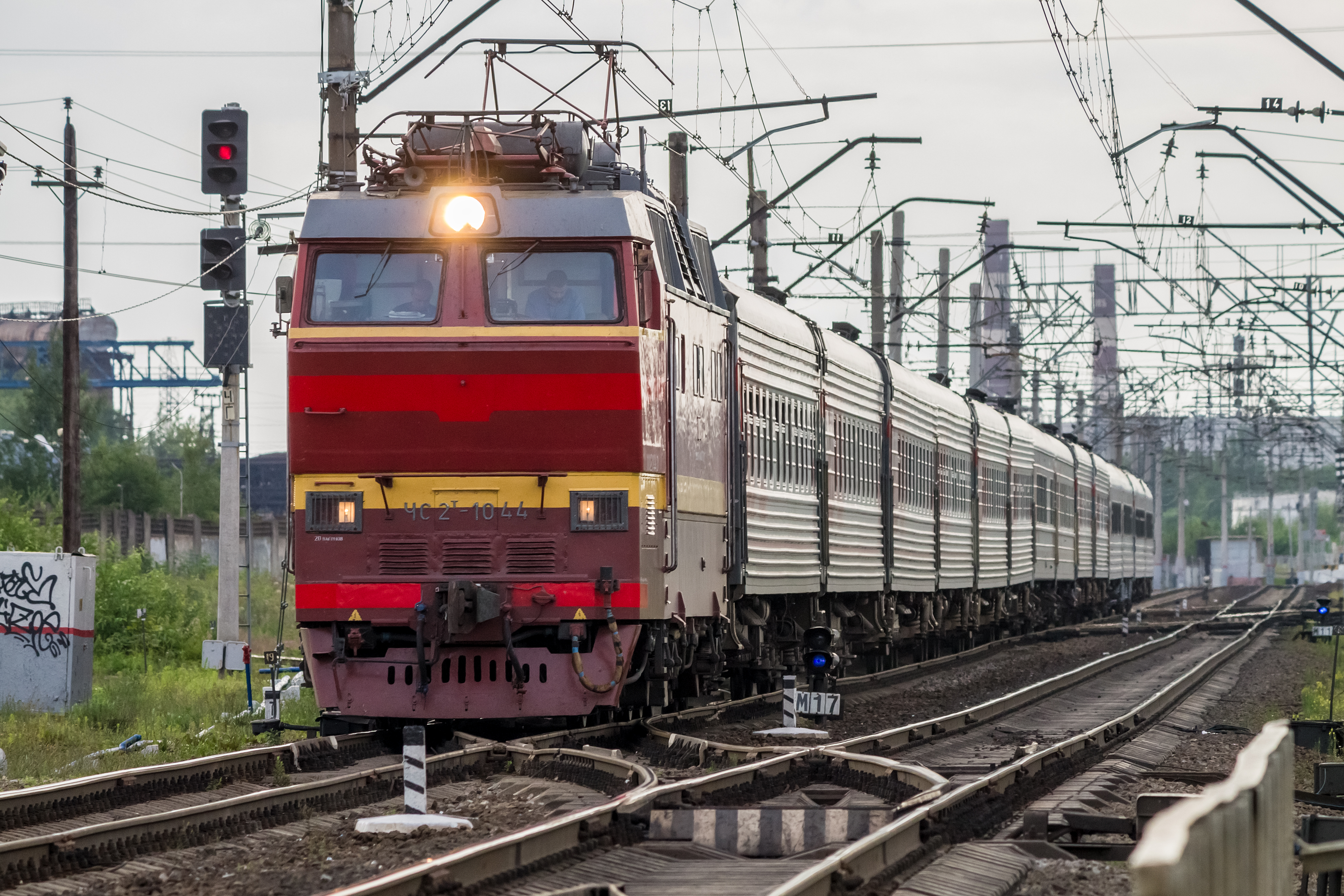
Electric locomotive Skoda CHS2T-1044 with passager train in Kolpino

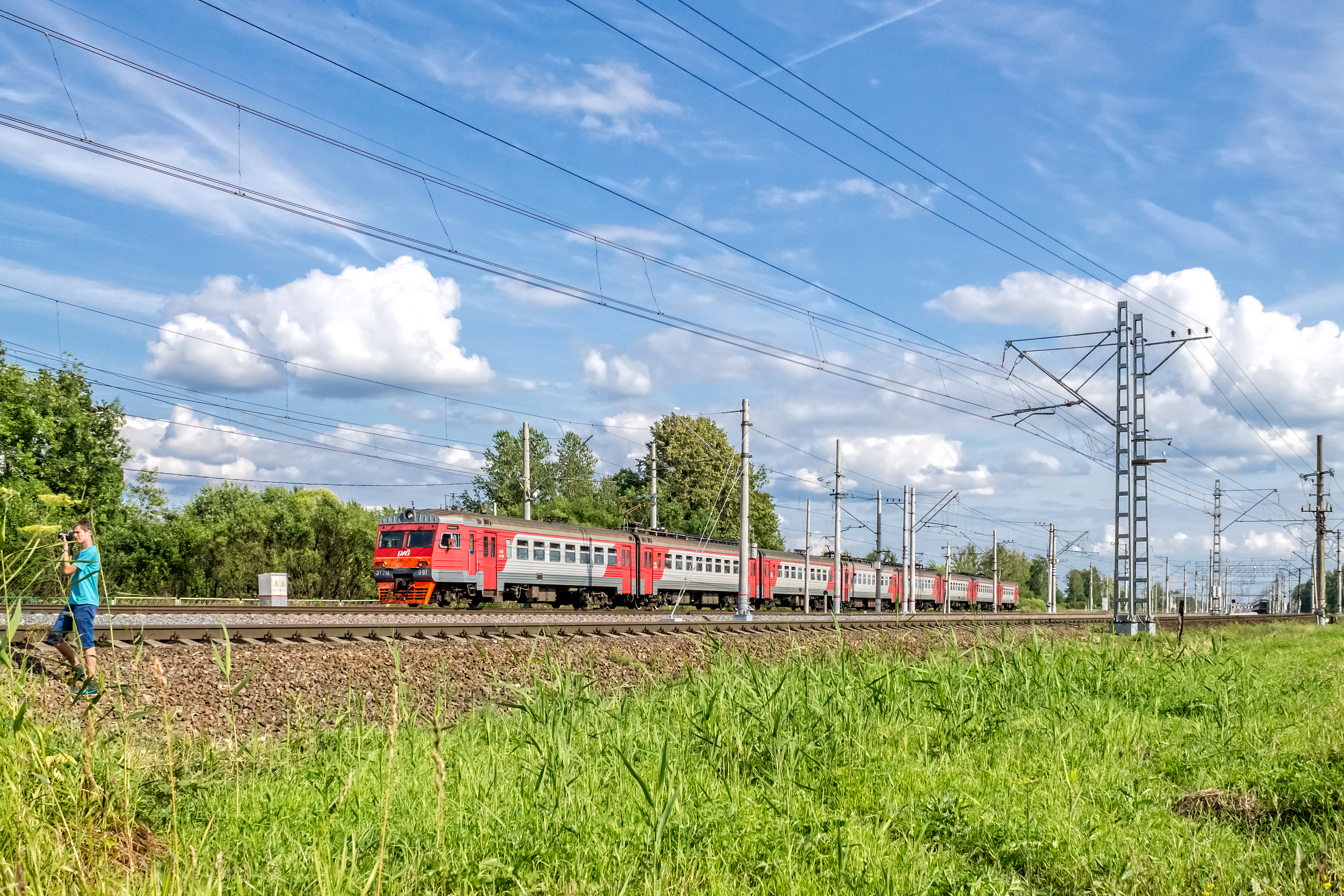
Electric train ET2M arrives to Kolpino station

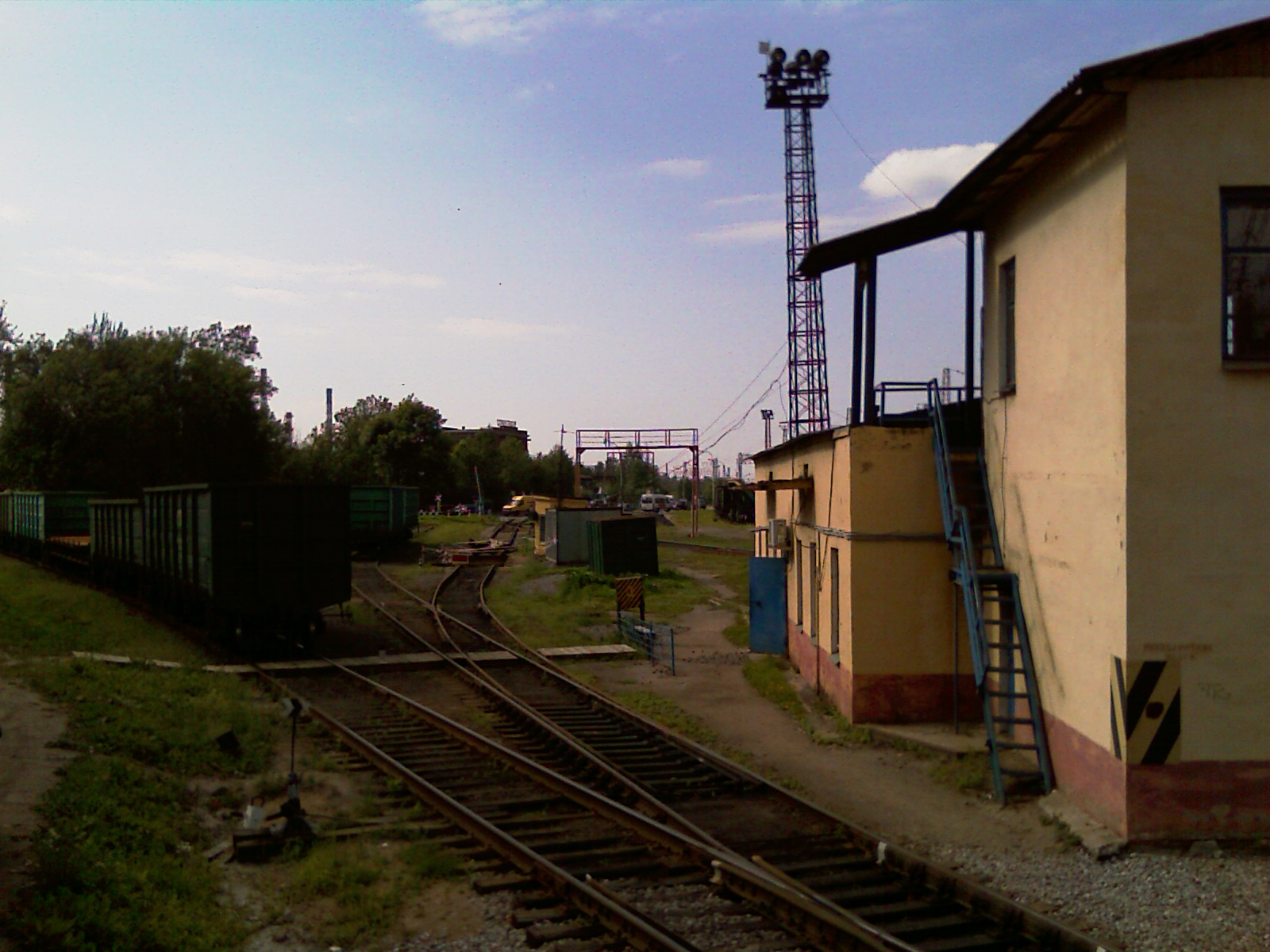
Freight yard connecting the station to Izhorskiye Zavody own railway network
