= Tsarskoye Selo Railway =

Railway line in the Russian Empire

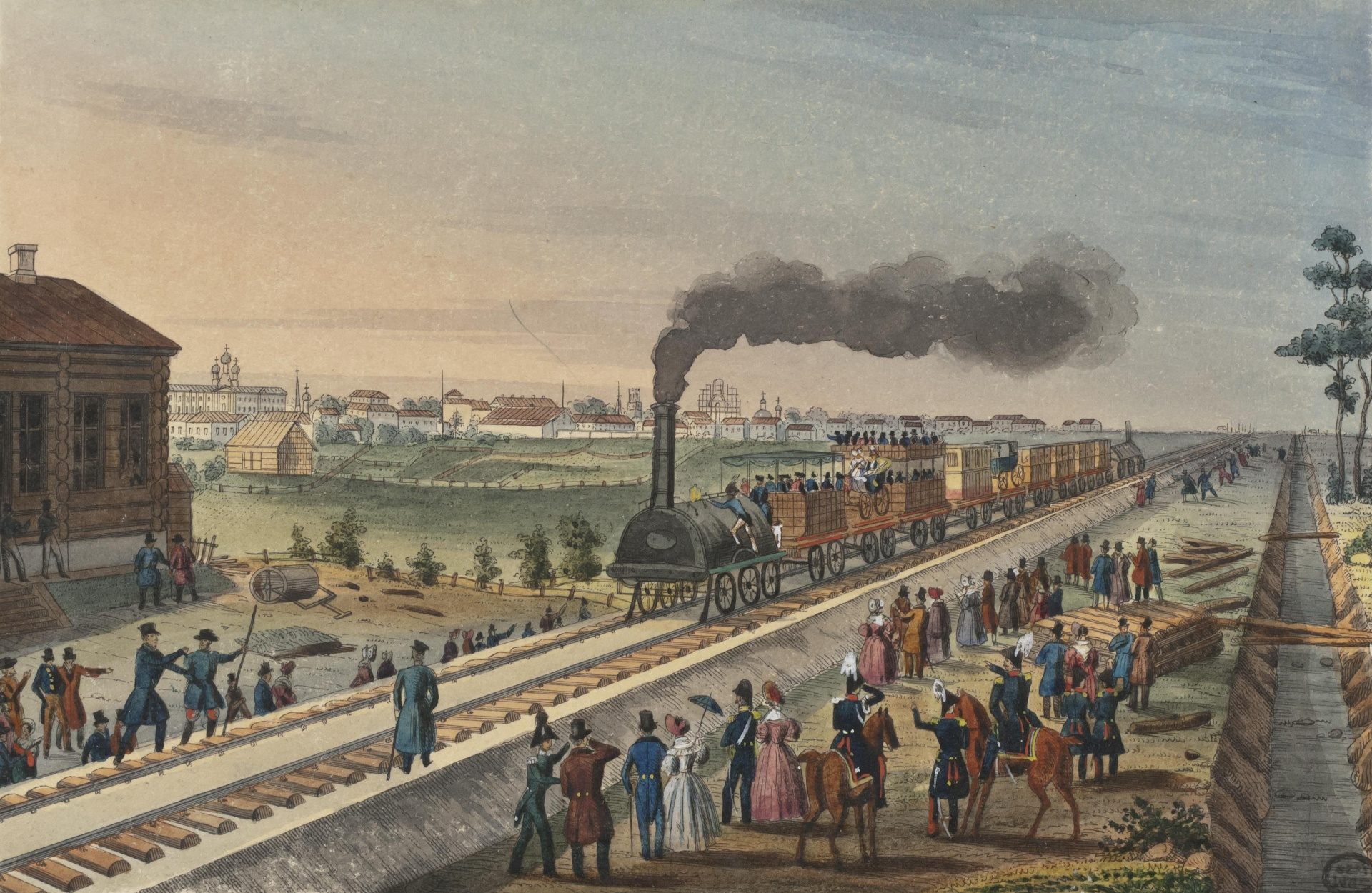
- Depiction of the arrival of the first train at Tsarskoye Selo on 30 October 1837, in a watercolor-tinted lithograph from the 1840s

Overview
- Native name: Царскосельская железная дорога
- Status: Passenger and cargo service
- Termini: Vitebsky Rail Terminal, Saint Petersburg; Pavlovsk, through Tsarskoye Selo

History
- Opened: 1837
- Closed: 1899

Technical
- Line length: 27 km (17 mi)
- Character: Passenger and freight
- Track gauge: 6 ft (1,829 mm)
- Operating speed: 30–45 km/h (19–28 mph)

The Tsarskoye Selo Railway (Russian: Царскосе́льская желе́зная доро́га) was the first public railway line in the Russian Empire. It ran for 27 km (17 mi) from Saint Petersburg to Pavlovsk through the nearby (4 km) Tsarskoye Selo. Construction began in May 1836, and the first test trips were carried out the same year between Tsarskoye Selo and Pavlovsk, using horse-drawn trains. The line was officially opened on 30 October 1837, when an 8-carriage train was hauled by a steam locomotive between Saint Petersburg and Tsarskoye Selo. Until the construction of the Saint Petersburg–Moscow railway in 1851, it was the only passenger train line in Russia. In 1899 it was merged into the Moscow–Windau–Rybinsk Railway and now forms part of the Oktyabrskaya Railway.

== History ==
The first railways in Russia were short and narrow-track lines with wooden and then steel rails, which were used in the 18th century to transport carriages with ore at numerous mines of the Urals. In particular, the Nizhny Tagil line built in 1833–1834 was equipped with a steam locomotive and could transport a few miners, together with the load of ore. The steam locomotive was constructed by the Russian engineers, father and son Cherepanovs. However, their design had not found application outside of their factory, and most hardware for the Tsarskoye Selo Railway, including rails, carriages, locomotives and railroad switches, was purchased abroad.

The first European railways had demonstrated their great economic potential, and in August 1834, the Russian Mining Ministry invited Austrian-Czech engineer Franz Anton von Gerstner to explore the possibility of building railways in Russia. After several months of travel through the country, in January 1835 he submitted a written report to Nicholas I and then met him in person, suggesting building railways between Moscow and St. Petersburg and then between Moscow, Kazan and Nizhny Novgorod. Gerstner's proposal was evaluated by a commission headed by Mikhail Speransky. The commission found the project feasible and recommended starting with a short railway between St. Petersburg, Tsarskoye Selo and the nearby Pavlovsk. This resolution was supported by the imperial decrees of 21 March and 15 April 1836.

== Construction ==
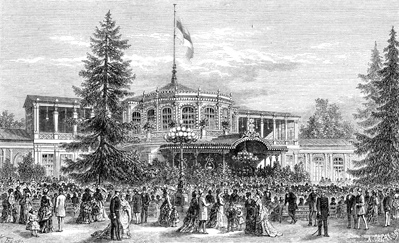
Pavlovsk train terminal, 19th century

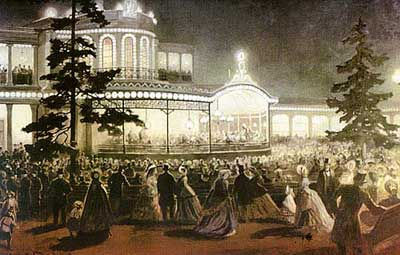
Ball in Pavlovsk on the 25th anniversary of the Tsarskoye Selo Railway

The construction and operation of the Tsarskoye Selo Railway was managed by a newly established joint-stock company headed by Count Alexander Bobrinsky (president), von Gerstner and businessmen Benedict Kramer and Ivan Konrad Plitt. The company had about 700 shareholders, both in Russia and in Europe. The work started in early May 1836 and was supervised by 17 engineers, some of whom were previously involved in railway construction in England. About 1800 workers were involved first and were then reinforced by 1400 soldiers. Aiming to promote the railways, the train terminal of Pavlovsk was built as an entertainment center. It regularly hosted evening festivities with invited celebrities, such as concerts of Johann Strauss II and his orchestra every summer from 1856 to 1865.

The line was straight, with a slight downhill slope toward St. Petersburg and had 42 bridges. The bridges were mostly wooden and 2–4 m (6.6–13.1 ft) long, with one stone bridge 27 m (88.6 ft) long. Apart from the wide rail spacing of 6 ft (1,829 mm), the structure was regular, with 3.2 m (10.5 ft) long wooden ties separated by 0.9 m (2 ft 11.4 in), resting on a layer of stones and gravel. Rails had a length of 3.7 m (12.1 ft), 4.6 or 4.9 m (15.1 or 16.1 ft) and a weight of 123 kg/m (248 lb/yd), 145.4 or 154 kg/m (293.1 or 310.4 lb/yd). While the line near Tsarskoye Selo was completed in 1836, the steam locomotives had not arrived yet, and the work near St. Petersburg was delayed by land purchasing problems.

Therefore, in order to test the road, first two two-carriage trains were pulled by horses on the Sundays of 27 September and 4 and 11 October 1836. The journey of about 4 kilometers between Tsarskoye Selo and Pavlovsk was taking 15 minutes. Test trips with steam locomotives started in November 1836 on a 7.5 km (4.7 mi) long section between Pavlovsk and the village of Bolshoe Kuzmino. Gerstner conducted those tests himself, with more than a hundred trips in the first week, and was mostly preoccupied with not hitting the wondering crowds of people who arrived to watch the curiosity. Passengers on one of those trips were Nicholas I and his family. These tests demonstrated that the line could be operated through the Russian winter, proving the skeptics wrong.

== Operation ==
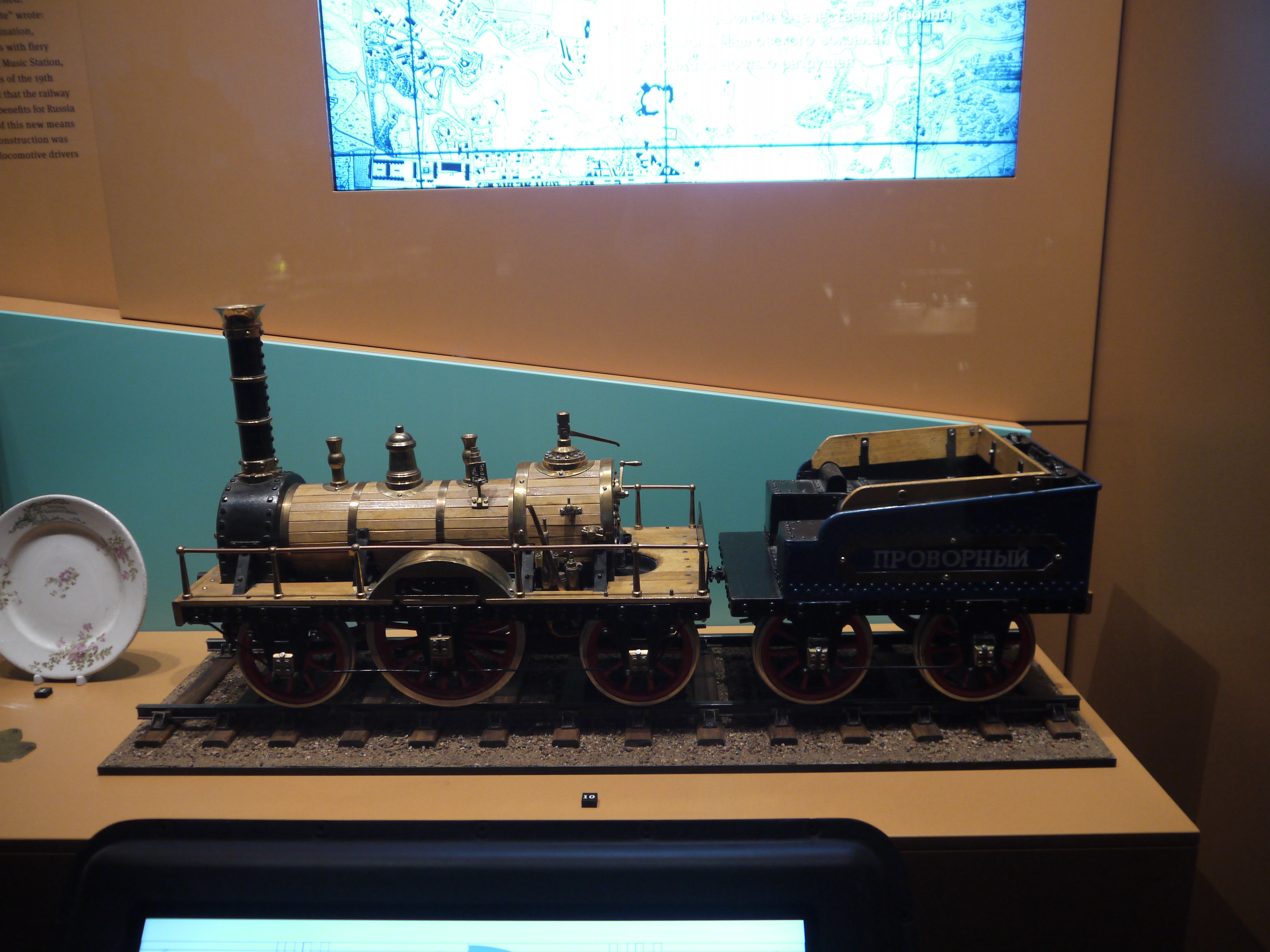
Model of Russia's first main line passenger locomotive, built by Robert Stephenson and Company for the Tsarskoye Selo Railway. The model is in the Russian Railway Museum.

The first regular train left St. Petersburg on 30 October 1837 and in 35 minutes arrived in Tsarskoye Selo. This train of eight carriages was pulled by a steam locomotive, and its arrival was observed by numerous noble guests, including Nicholas I. Regular service started in January 1838. Between January and April 1838, most trains were pulled by horses, and steam locomotives were used only on Sundays and public holidays. Beginning in April, horse power was eliminated, and almost 14,000 passengers were transported during the month.

The trains ran without stops between St. Petersburg and Tsarskoye Selo, and beginning in May 1838 were reaching Pavlovsk. All communication was first done by voice and whistle. An optical telegraph was installed in 1838. It consisted of piles separated by 1–2 km (0.6–1.2 mi) and a guard on duty in a shed nearby. Signals were set by raising 1, 2 or 3 black disks (daytime) or red lamps (night) on the pile and took about 30 minutes to transmit along the line. Electrical telegraph was installed in 1845, but it was dismantled in 1848 due to frequent failures; a more reliable system was set up in 1856.

The first trips were unscheduled; a train schedule was introduced on 15 May 1838, with five trips per day between 9am and 10pm (7am and 11pm in summer). Trains left the opposite terminal stations simultaneously and would bypass each other at a specially designed crossing in the middle of the line. After a head-on collision of two trains on 11 August 1840, trains ran only one way at a time. Some passengers were allowed to travel with their small horse-pulled carriages, which were transported on the open platforms of the train. Smoking on the train was prohibited for reasons of safety; violators were removed from the train and their names reported to their employers. The same rules applied to drunkards. Smoking trains were introduced in 1857. A second, parallel line was laid in summer 1876 that increased the capacity of the railway. A train repair workshop was built around that time in St. Petersburg.

The railway was profitable, with the ratio of profit to expenses about 1.7. The railway was operated by 236 employees, whose salary took about 22% of the company income. The line mostly transported people, with only about 5% cargo trains. The railway was absorbed by the much bigger Moscow-Windau-Rybinsk Railway in 1899–1900 and converted to the standard 1,524 mm (5 ft) Russian gauge.

== Rolling stock ==
By 1837 the railroads had 6 locomotives, 44 passenger carriages and 19 cargo carriages. In the 1830s–1840s, each train pulled 8 carriages at an average speed of about 30 km/h (19 mph); the speed increased to some 42 km/h (26 mph) in the 1870s. The locomotives of 75–120 hp (56–89 kW) were purchased in England and Belgium. They weighed about 16 tonnes (15.7 long tons; 17.6 short tons) and reached a top on-line speed of about 60 km/h (37 mph).

The carriages had wooden frames and two pairs of cast iron wheels with steel rims. Their bottom parts were built in England and the top in Belgium or Russia. The top (passenger part) was nailed to the wooden bottom frame. The carriages had no heating, and their top parts had four different designs. Their capacity varied between 30 and 42 passengers.

Starting from 1856, imported locomotives were supplemented by local ones, produced on a factory managed by Maximilian de Beauharnais, 3rd Duke of Leuchtenberg.

== Legacy ==
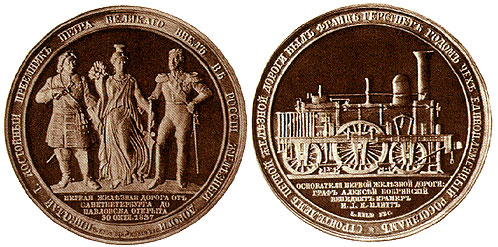
Copper medal minted on the occasion of the opening of the Tsarskoye Selo Railway

The Tsarskoye Selo Railway had a short length, very limited capacity, and nearly no industrial value – it was mainly transporting nobles for sightseeing in Tsarskoye Selo and festivities in Pavlovsk. Yet it was regarded as an important step in the development of a rail network in Russia. In particular, experience demonstrated the drawbacks of the 6 ft (1,829 mm) rail spacing, and the following rail networks used the more standard 5 ft (1,524 mm) gauge tracks. In the 1840–50s, the Tsarskoye Selo Railway was actively used for training of railroad personnel and various locomotive and railroad tests.

The opening of the Tsarskoye Selo Railway in 1837 was an extremely popular event, reflected in the news and in handicrafts and theater performances in Russia. A copper medal (60 mm or 2.36 in diameter) was minted to commemorate the opening of the railway. Its obverse featured Peter I, Minerva and Nicholas I, as well as the text "The first railroad from St. Petersburg to Pavlovsk was opened on 30 October 1837. Nicholas I, the follower of Peter I, introduced railways to Russia". The reverse pictured a steam locomotive and read "The founders of the first railway Count Alexander Bobrinsky, Benedict Kramer and I. K. Plitt. The builder of the railway was Franz Gerstner, born Czech and cognate to Russians". Several hundred medals were minted to be distributed at the opening of the railway, but for unknown reasons Nicholas I did not approve.

== See also ==
- History of rail transport in Russia
- Russian Railway Museum
