= DT1 multiple unit =

Passenger train

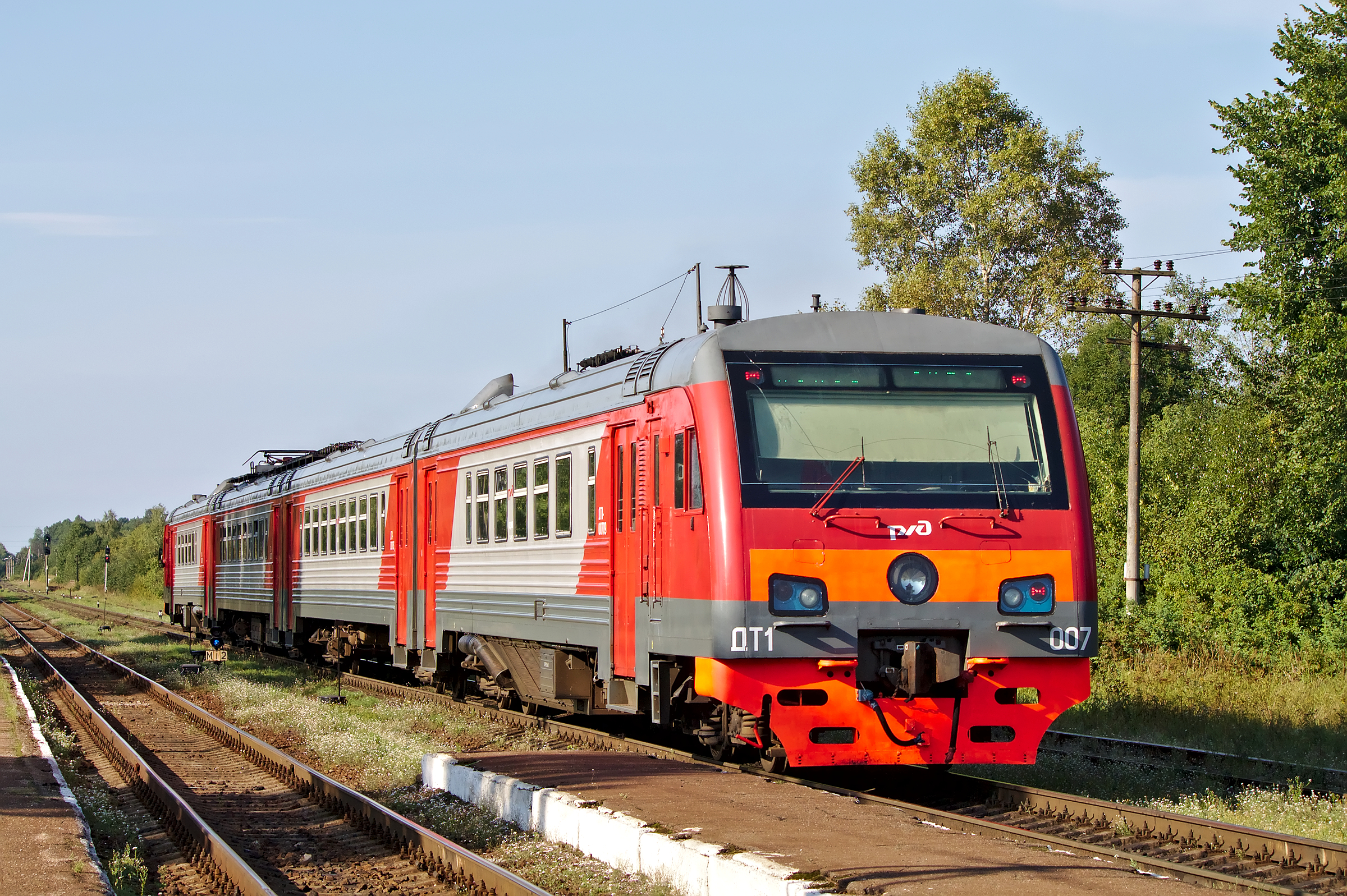
- DT1-007 at Plyussa railway station
- Manufacturer: Torzhok car-building factory
- Constructed: 2008
- Entered service: from 2009
- Number built: 13
- Number in service: 001 - 013
- Lines served: From SPb-Baltic to Pskov, Gdov, Ivangorod and Slantsy From SPB-Vitebskiy to Novgorod and Batetskaya, from Novgorod to Luga

Specifications
- Coupling system: SA3
- Track gauge: 1,520 mm (4 ft 11 27/32 in) Russian gauge

The DT1 (Diesel train Torzhok, type 1, rus: ДТ1 (Дизель-поезд Торжокский, 1-й тип)) is a dual-mode multiple unit passenger train developed at the Torzhoksky car-building factory in Russia in 2007. The train has electric and diesel power, and is intended to be used for suburban transport on 1,520 mm (4 ft 11 27/32 in) gauge railways, with both low and high passenger platforms in macroclimatic areas with a temperate climate.

The DT1 is the first dual-mode train produced in Russia. It has a top speed of 110 kilometres per hour (68 mph). It has 370 seats, with a total capacity of 878 passengers.

== Operation history ==
DT1-010 departs from Yekaterinburg rail terminal

Russian railways began operation of the DT1 in 2009 on the Saint Petersburg - Pskov, "Pleskov." route. Two trains were in operation, running on an express route out of Baltiysky Rail Terminal.

The volume of purchases for these trains has promptly increased since 2009. The Russian Railway company is pending implementing units for multiple routes, including from Saint Petersburg to Gdov, Sortavala, and Primorsk (through station Ushkovo).

== See also ==
- The Museum of the Moscow Railway, at Paveletsky Rail Terminal, Moscow
- Rizhsky Rail Terminal, home of the Moscow Railway Museum
- Varshavsky Rail Terminal, St.Petersburg, former home of the Central Museum of Railway Transport, Russian Federation
- History of rail transport in Russia
