= ED4 (Electric trainset) =

Russian electric trainset used by RZD

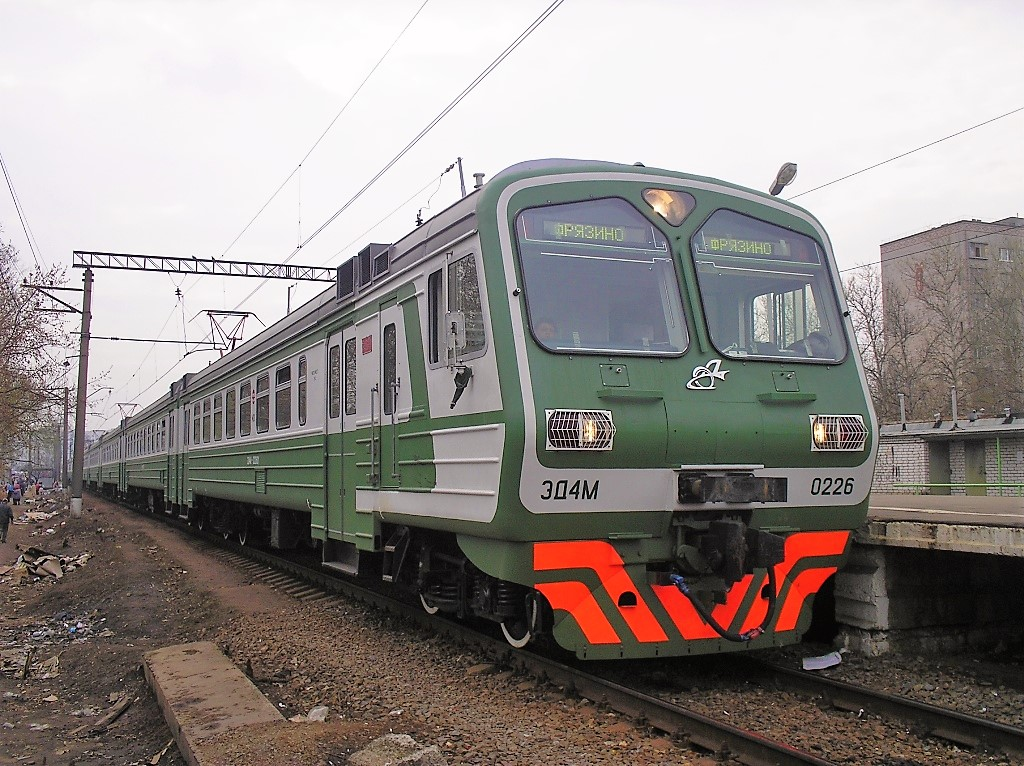
- Manufacturer: DMZ
- Replaced: ER2
- Constructed: from 1996
- Entered service: from 1997
- Number built: 475 (as of August 2014)
- Formation: 4, 6, 7, 8, 9, 10, 11, 12 cars
- Operators: Russian Railways
- Depots: 3+
- Lines served: 5+

Specifications
- Car body construction: steel, aluminium
- Train length: (4) 88.224 m (289 ft 5 3/8 in) (6) 132.336 m (434 ft 2 1/8 in) (7) 154.392 m (506 ft 6 3/8 in) (8) 176.448 m (578 ft 10 3/4 in) (9) 198.504 m (651 ft 3 1/8 in) (10) 220.56 m (723 ft 7 1/2 in) (11) 242.616 m (795 ft 11 3/4 in) (12) 264.672 m (868 ft 4 1/8 in)
- Car length: 22.056 m (72 ft 4 3/8 in)
- Width: 3,522 mm (11 ft 6 5/8 in)
- Height: 4,253 mm (13 ft 11 1/2 in)
- Maximum speed: 130 km/h (81 mph)
- Acceleration: 0.67 m/s^{2} (2.2 ft/s^{2})
- Deceleration: 0.65 m/s^{2} (2.1 ft/s^{2})
- Electric system(s): 3 kV DC Catenary
- Current collection: Pantograph
- Coupling system: SA3
- Track gauge: 1,520 mm (4 ft 11 27/32 in) Russian gauge

ED4 (Electric train Demikhovskiy 4-th modification) are a series of Russian electric trainsets, in production since 1996. The trains are produced by DMZ and currently in service on RZD lines in almost every part of the country and former USSR states.

== Production history ==
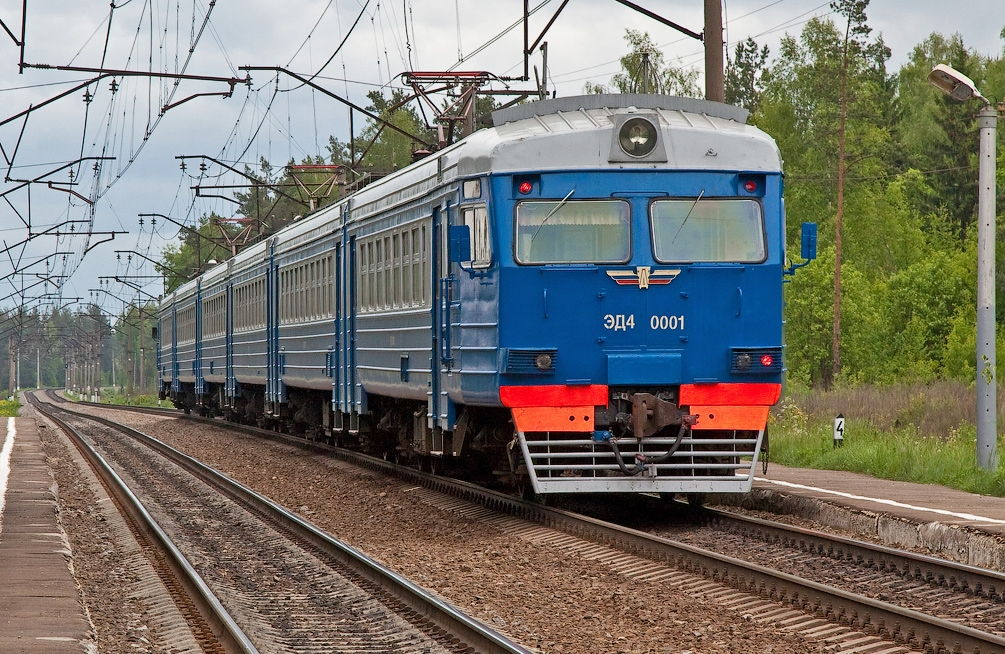
ED4-0001

The ED4 was designed to accommodate Russia's need for a domestically produced electric train-set. Russia's most widely exploited electric trains, the ER1 and ER2 series, were produced by the Rīgas Vagonbūves Rūpnīca (RVR) plant in Latvia before the collapse of the USSR.

Design work began in 1996 on the basis of the earlier ED2T series, which were largely equipped with RVR components. Electronic equipment for the new train was manufactured by The Novocherkassk Electric Locomotive Plant, while the drive-train was built in Novosibirsk. ED4 train-cars, like ED2T train-cars, differ externally from those of ER1 and ER2 by wider doors.

After successfully completing testing, the first train entered service at the Mineralnye Vody Depot of the North Caucasus Railway.

Only 6 trains (numbers 0001, 0005—0007, 0010, 0014) carry the early ED4 identification, as the second variant, ED4M, began exclusive production thereafter. The main difference between the two trains is the equipment and shape of the operator's compartment.

Four of the early ED4 trains are in currently in service on the Moscow Railway, one on the North Caucasian Railway, and one in Belgorod.

== Variants and modifications ==
=== ED4M ===
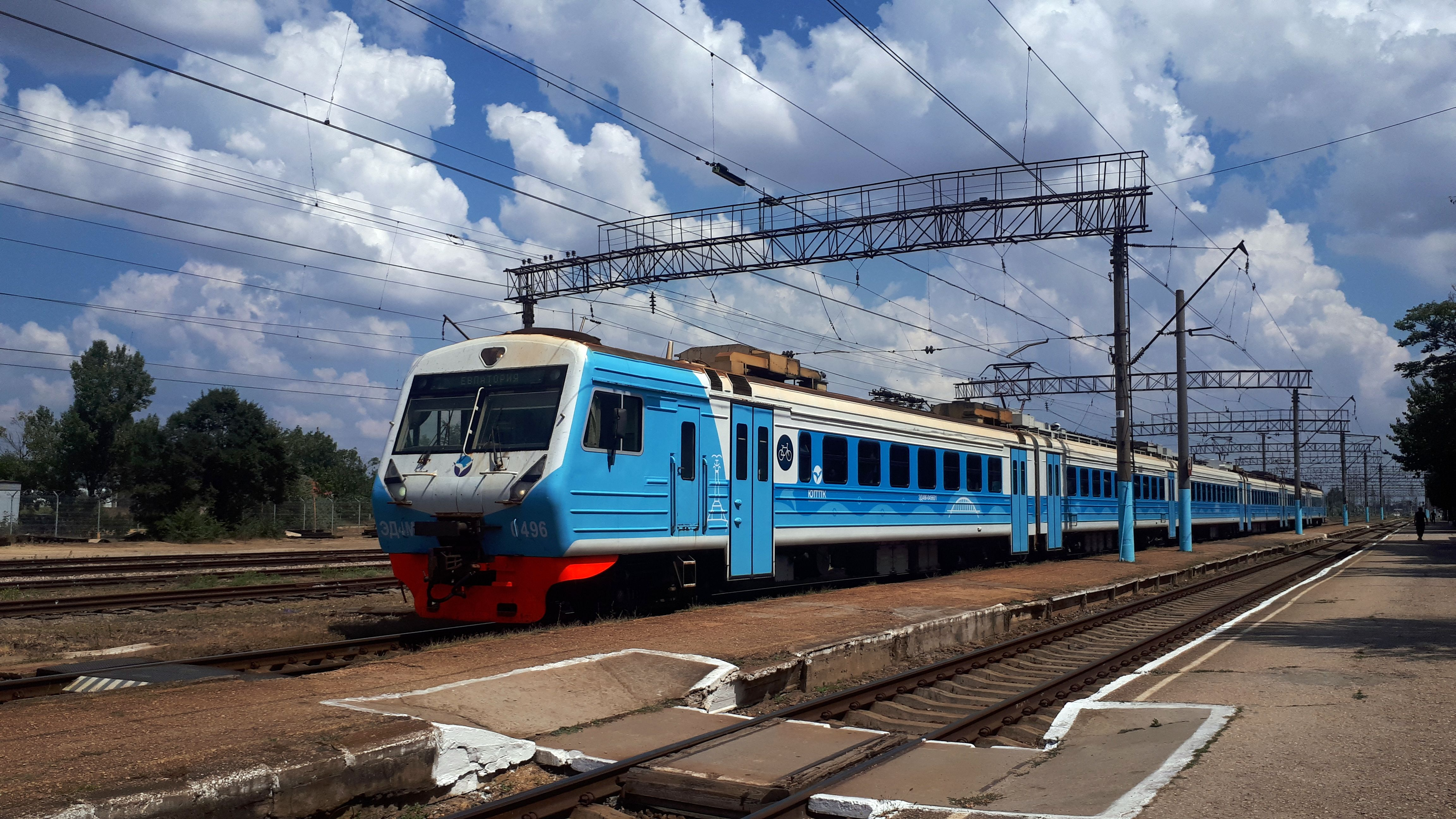
ED4M with stairs for low platforms (doors with steps)

=== ED4M^{1} ===
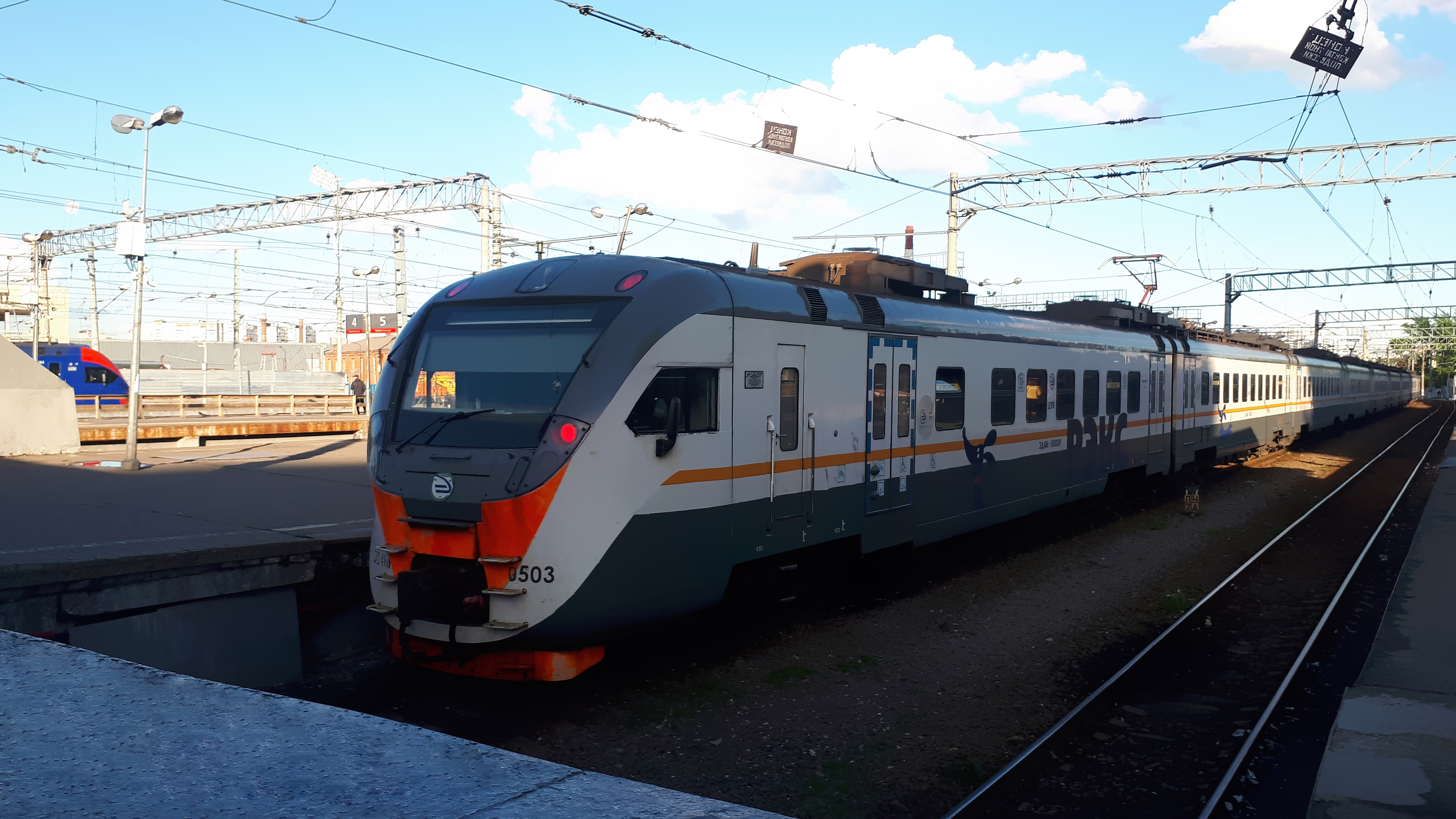
ED4M 500 series

=== ED4MK ===
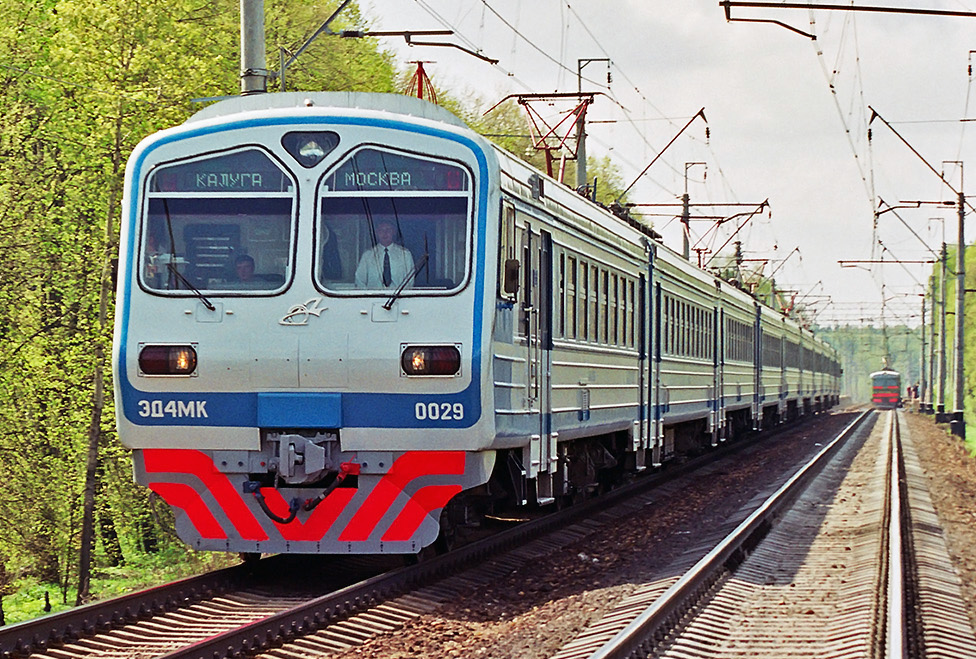
ED4MK

=== ED4MKu ===
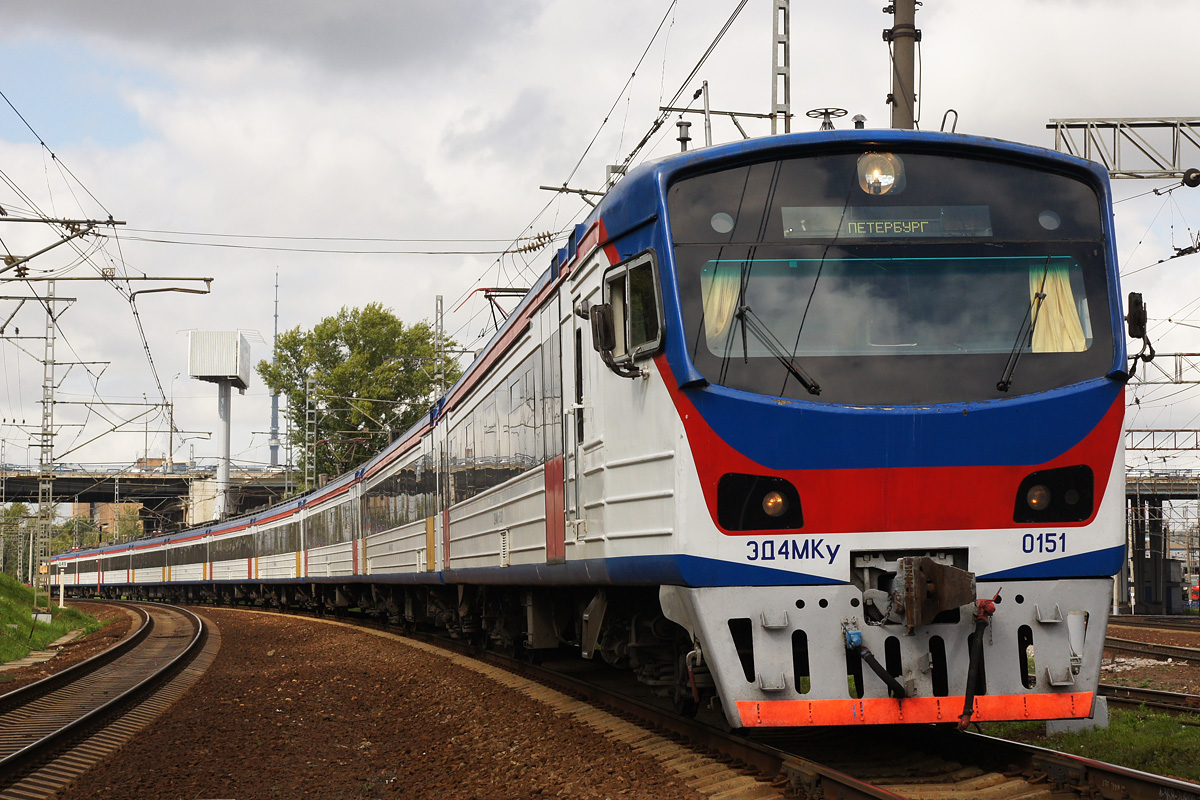
ED4MKu

=== ED4MKM ===
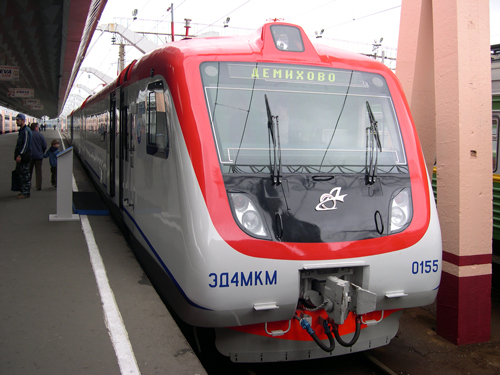
ED4MKM

=== ED4MKM-AERO ===
Mechanically almost identical to the ED4MKM, these trains have an updated interior, modified for the needs of airport commuters. The AERO trains are in service in Moscow and St.Petersburg, serving the Domodedovo, Vnukovo, Sheremtyevo and Pulkovo airports, respectively. The modified door mechanisms of the AERO were used on all later ED4M trains.

=== ED4E ===
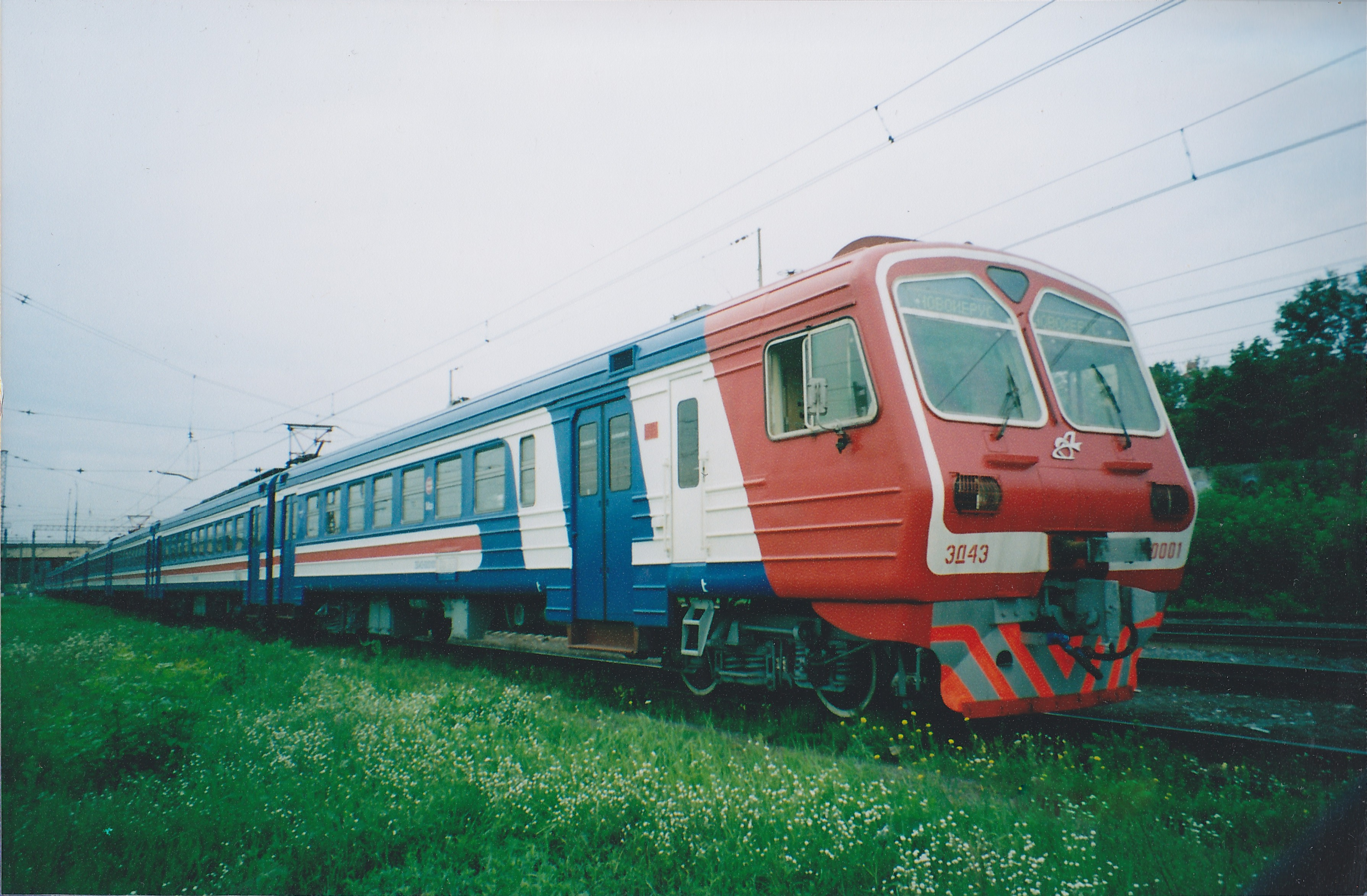
ED4E

== See also ==
- The Museum of the Moscow Railway, at Paveletsky Rail Terminal, Moscow
- Rizhsky Rail Terminal, Home of the Moscow Railway Museum
- Varshavsky Rail Terminal, St.Petersburg, Home of the Central Museum of Railway Transport, Russian Federation
- History of rail transport in Russia
