= Vitebsky railway station =

Railway station in St. Petersburg, Russia

St. Petersburg–Vitebsky Санкт-Петербург–Витебский
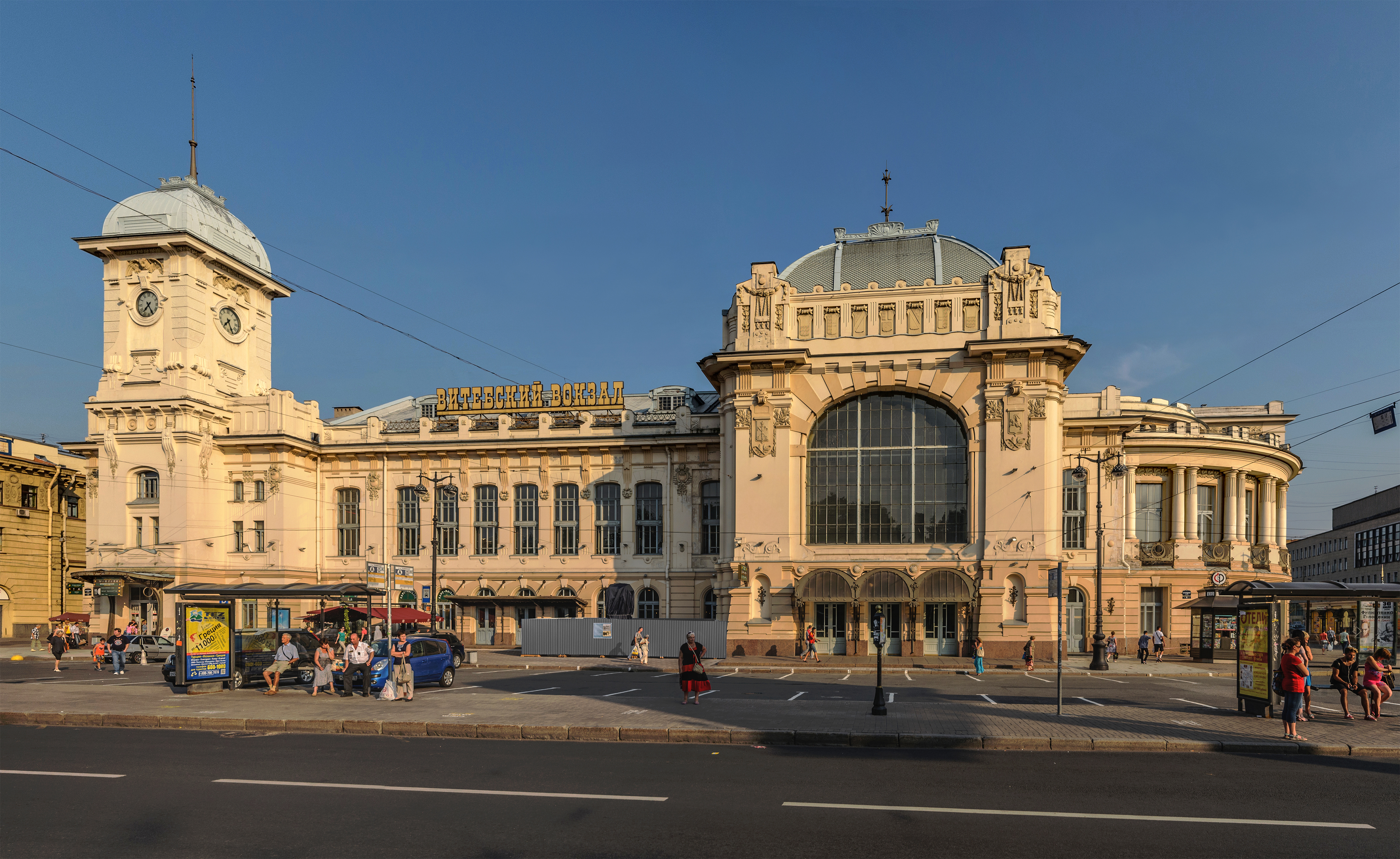
- Vitebsk Railway Station in July 2014

General information
- Location: 52, Zagorodny av., St. Petersburg, Russia
- Coordinates: 59.9199°N 30.3289°E
- Platforms: 5 (3 island platforms)
- Tracks: 8
- Connections: Saint Petersburg Metro stations: Pushkinskaya; Zvenigorodskaya

Construction
- Structure type: elevated
- Platform levels: 2
- Parking: yes
- Architect: Stanisław Brzozowski

Other information
- Station code: 033061
- Fare zone: 0

History
- Opened: 1837
- Rebuilt: 1852, 1904
- Electrified: 1953
- Former names: Tsarskoselsky, Detskoselsky
Location

St. Petersburg–Vitebsky (Russian: Ви́тебский вокза́л) is a railway station terminal in Saint Petersburg, Russia. Formerly known as St. Petersburg–Tsarskoselsky station because its first line led to the suburban royal residences town of Tsarskoye Selo, it was the first railway station to be built in Saint Petersburg and the whole of the Russian Empire (while its present-day building is much newer). Later, with considerable extension of its lines, the station was renamed after a much farther destination: Vitebsk, a city in Belarus.

== Early history ==
The station, located at the crossing of the Zagorodny Avenue and the now-vanished Vvedensky Canal, was inaugurated in the presence of Nicholas I of Russia on 30 October 1837 when the first Russian train, named Provorny, departed from its platform for the imperial residence at Tsarskoe Selo. A replica of this train may be seen as a permanent exhibit at the modern station.

The first building of the Petersburg Station (as it was then known) was constructed in timber in August and September of the same year to a design by Konstantin Thon. Since it proved to be too small, it was demolished within twelve years and a much larger structure was erected under Thon's supervision between 1849 and 1852. There were further expansions in the 1870s.

== Architecture ==
The station became increasingly ramshackle and cluttered as the 19th century went on, until the decision was taken to tear the whole building down and begin again. Construction started in 1901 and lasted for three years. Stanisław Brzozowski gave the new two-storey station an ornate frontage in an assortment of historical styles, with decorative reliefs, floriated Jugendstil detailing, outsize semicircular windows and two regular features of 19th-century train stations: a pseudo-Renaissance dome and a square clocktower.

However, it was Sima Minash's opulent Art Nouveau interior that established the building as the most ornate of St Petersburg stations. Minash was responsible for the sweeping staircases, foyer with stained glass and spacious halls boasting a series of painted panels that chronicle the history of Russia's first railway. The building's soaring arches and expanses of glass proclaimed the architect's familiarity with advanced construction techniques of the West.

Vitebsky railway station, unlike other railway terminals, does not have a station square in front of it – its main facade looks out onto the Zagorodny Prospect.1

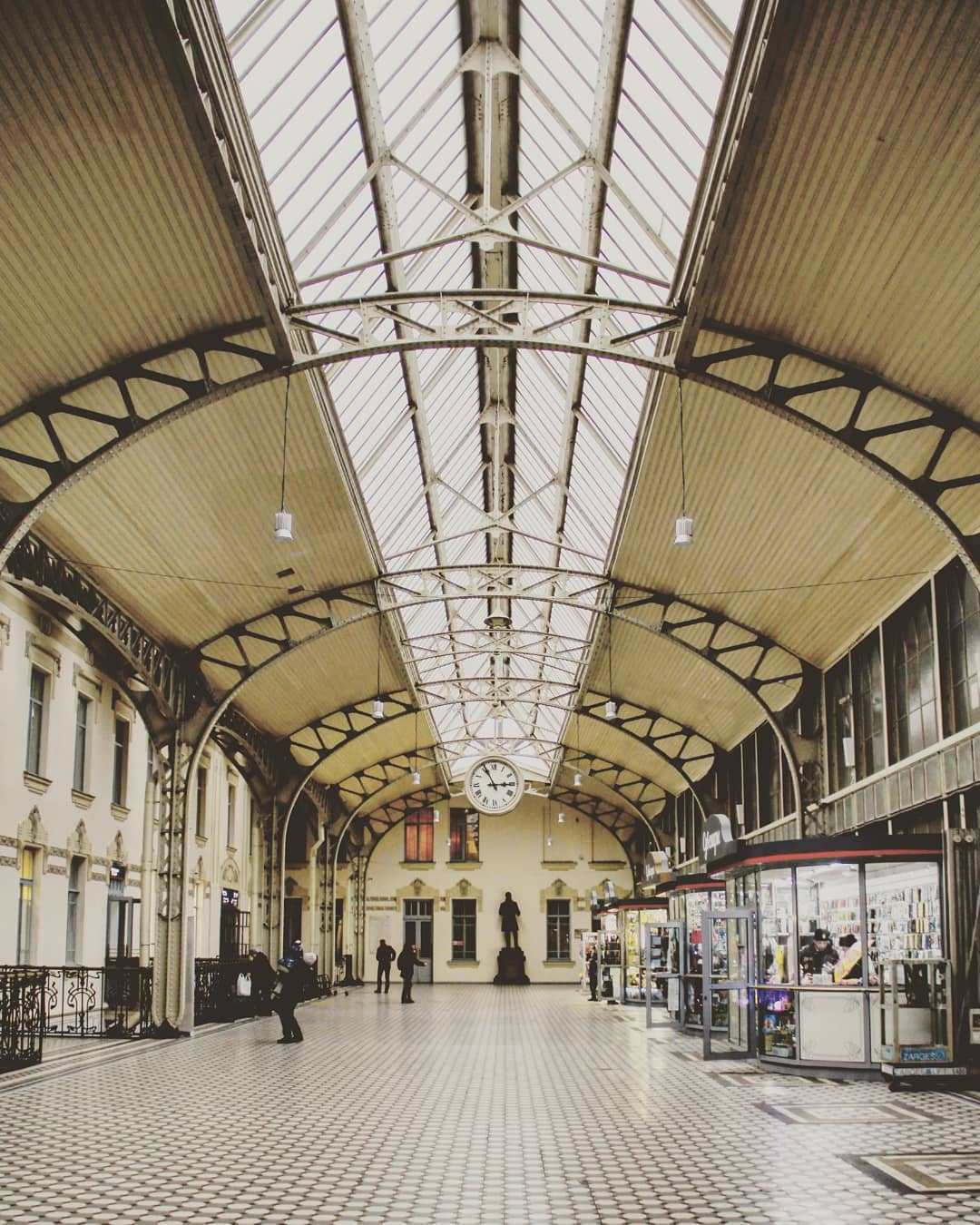

== Recent history ==
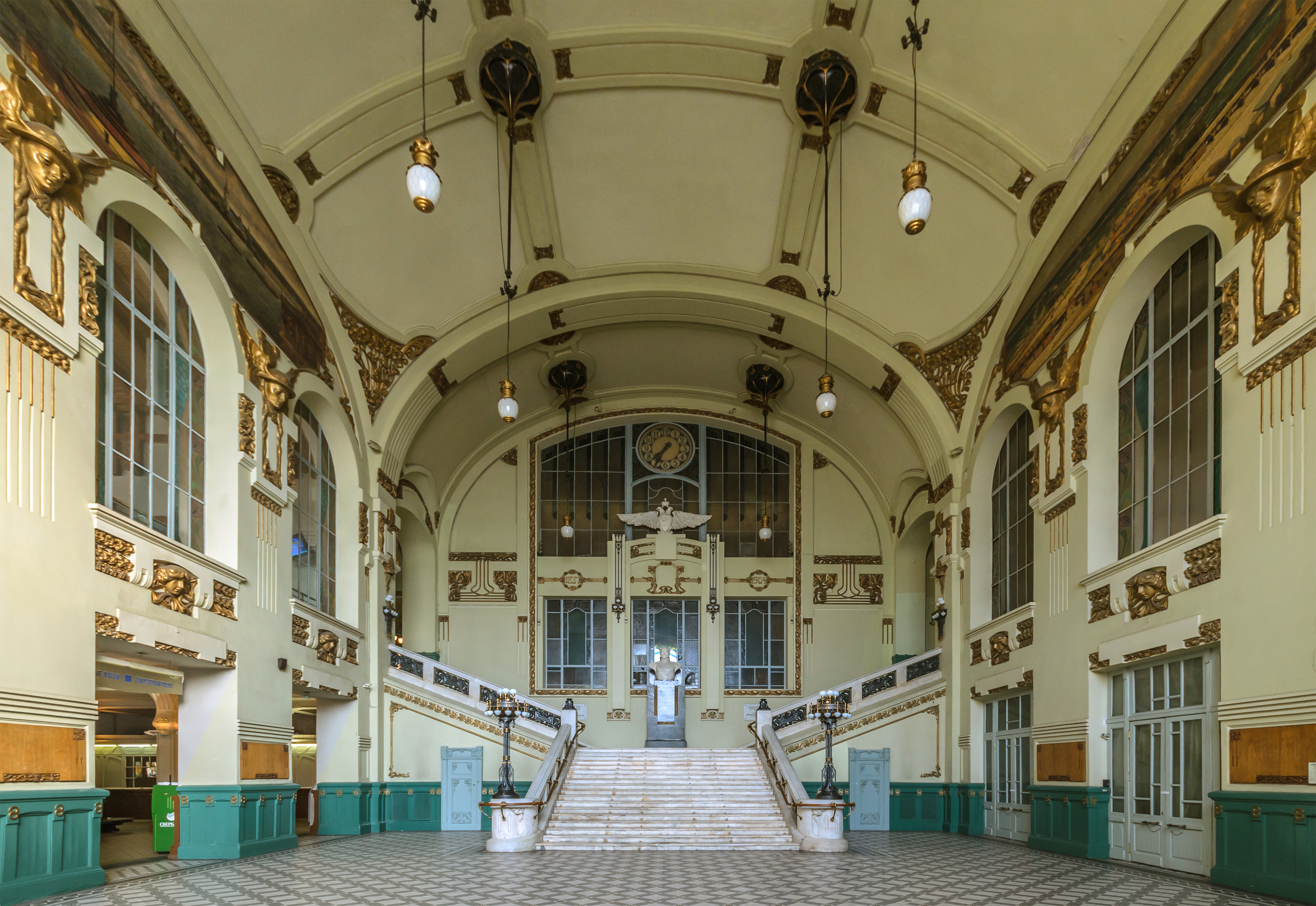
The elaborate Art Nouveau interior.

In a departure from normal practice of the Soviet years, the Vitebsk station preserved its elevated train shed, five platforms and luggage elevators almost intact, making it an ideal location for filming Soviet adaptations of Anna Karenina, Sherlock Holmes stories, and other 19th-century classics.

On the other hand, much architectural detail was removed from the facade and halls during insensitive Soviet renovations. Just prior to the tercentenary celebrations of 2003, the station underwent a painstaking restoration of its original interior and Jugendstil decor. Apart from the replica of the first Russian train, curiosities of the Vitebsk Station include a detached pavilion for the Tsar and his family and a marble bust of Nicholas I.

Services from the station run to Central Europe, the Baltic States, Ukraine, Belarus and the southern suburbs of St Petersburg, such as Pushkin and Pavlovsk. The station is connected to the Pushkinskaya Station of the Saint Petersburg Metro.

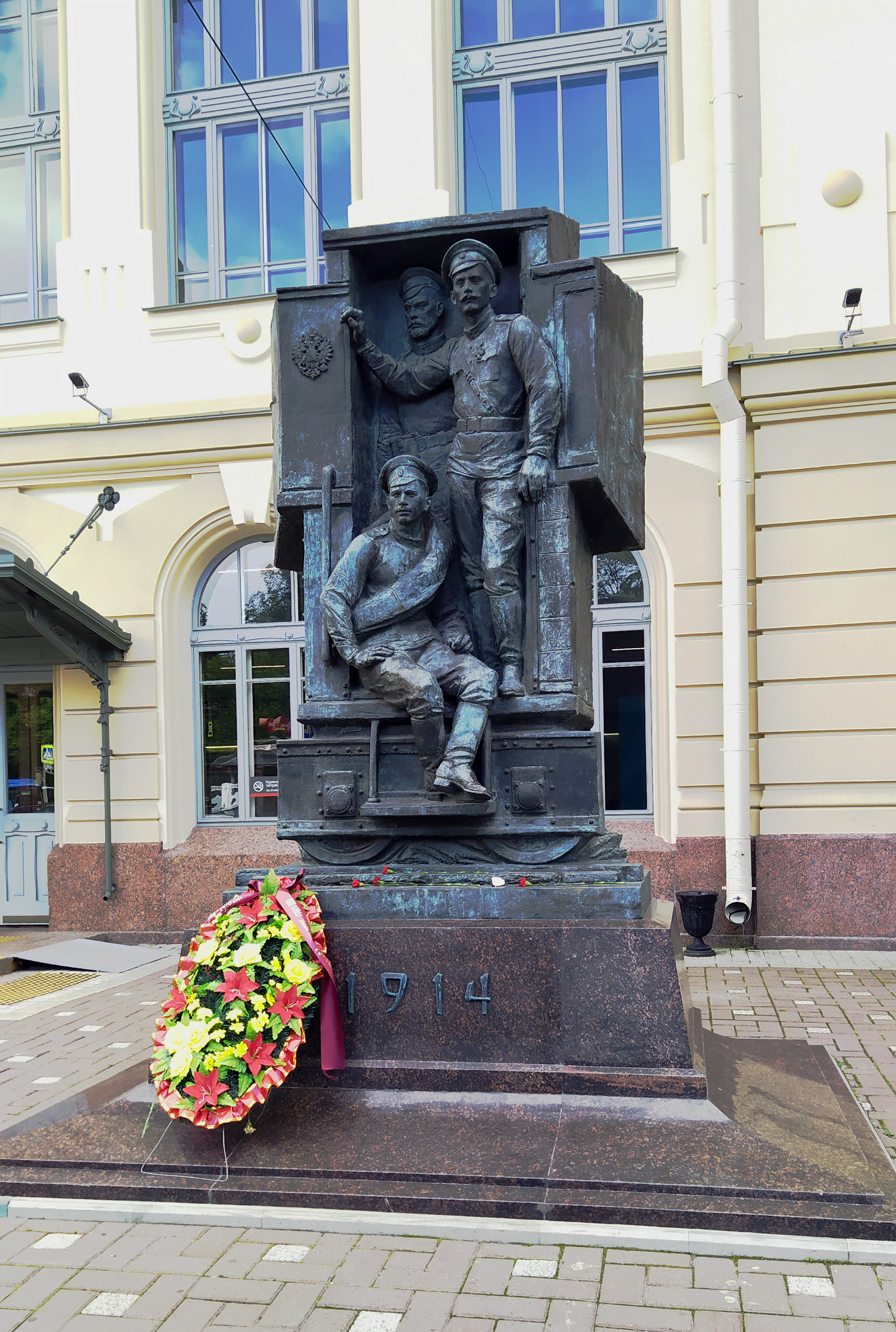
Monument to the heroes of the First World War at the Vitebsk railway station.

== See also ==
- Former Emperor's railway station in Pushkin town
- Tsarskoye Selo
- Pushkin, Saint Petersburg
- Tsarskoye Selo Railway

== Sources ==
- Богданов И.А. Витебский вокзал и Царскосельская железная дорога. // Новый журнал. 2002. No. 2. Pages 157-192.
