= Imperatorsky pavilyon railway station =

Former railway station terminal in Russia

Emperor's Railway Station / Emperor's Tsarskoye Selo Station
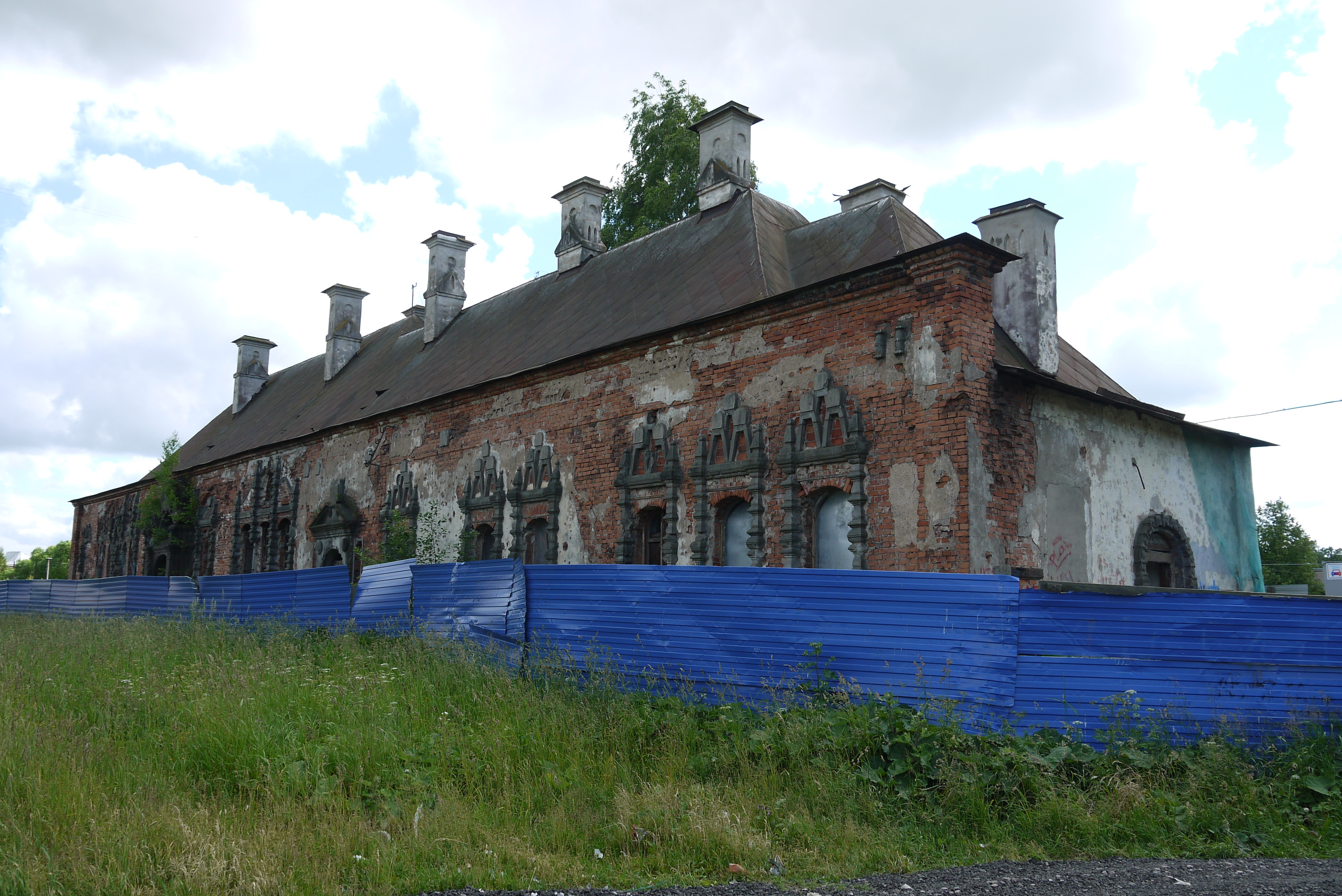
- Emperor's Tsarskoye Selo Station building, in its present semi-ruined state, as seen from the northwest

General information
- Location: Akademicheskiy Prospect, Pushkin, Saint Petersburg; Russia
- Coordinates: 59°43′53″N 30°23′03″E

Construction
- Structure type: Russian Revival architecture

History
- Opened: 1895 (current building 1912)
- Closed: 1940s
- Rebuilt: 1911–1912
Location

The Emperor's railway station or Emperor's Tsarskoye Selo Station, known as the Emperor's Pavilion (Russian: Императорский павильон, transliteration Imperatorsky pavilyon), is a former railway station terminal in Russia, in the town Tsarskoye Selo (now Pushkin, Saint Petersburg), which served the last monarch of Russia Emperor Nicholas II with his family and courtiers over his dedicated Emperor's Tsarskoye Selo Railway that eventually consisted of three lines to link the capital city of the empire, Saint Petersburg, with two of the suburban royal residences in the towns of Tsarskoye Selo (Rus. "Royal Village") and Gatchina. The Tsarskoye Selo Alexander Palace and Park estate was home to Nicholas and his family for their last 13 years. The Russian royal family had two other private railway station terminals named Emperor's Pavilions - one in Moscow and another one at Saint Petersburg Vitebsky railway station.

== Map ==
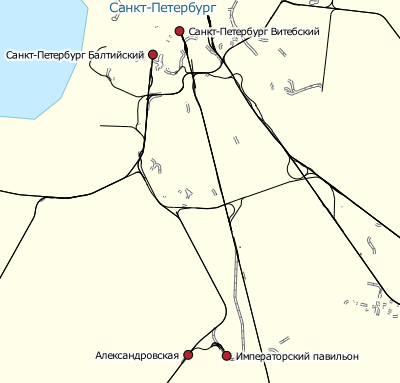
The rail network south of Saint Petersburg, showing main lines and the private imperial railway through Tsarskoye Selo. The red dots are railway stations; these are - clockwise from the top left - Baltiysky, Vitebsky, Tsarskoye Selo's Imperatorsky pavilyon, and Alexandrovskaya.

== The first station ==
In 1895, at the beginning of the reign of Tsar Nicholas II, a pavilion was built to accommodate the Imperial family when traveling by train from St. Petersburg to the Alexandrovskaya station, which served Tsarskoye Selo. Approved on 30 June 1895, a wooden Imperial Pavilion with a covered platform was built. The pavilion was asymmetrical in plan and had only 4 rooms. The total area of the building was 24.38 square meters. A year later, on 9 August 1896, a project for an extension to the Imperial Pavilion was approved.

The total area of the pavilion increased to 41.7 square meters. The so-called Imperial branch of the Moscow-Vindava-Rybinsk railway, starting at the Imperial Pavilion adjacent to the Vitebsky railway station opened in 1902. It started at Vitebsk station, where a special pavilion for the Emperor and his relatives was built in 1902. It ran parallel to the main line of the Tsarskoye Selo Railway and then branched south west at the village of Kouzmino. In 1903, the line was extended to the Imperial pavilion. It was reserved for members of the imperial family and representatives of foreign powers.

== The second station ==
The pavilion burned down in January 1911 and a new construction project was prepared by Vladimir Pokrovsky, one of the favorite architects of Tsar Nicholas II, who had just completed the construction of the Feodorovsky cathedral, which served as a family parish church for the Emperor and his family. The railway station was completed in 1912. A long alley of lime trees still leads to the Feodorovsky Imperial Cathedral and then a paved road leads to the Alexander Palace, located one kilometer from the station.

=== Architecture ===
The style of the pavilion is Russian Revival architecture, as with the Feodorovsky Village and its buildings (the cathedral, the personal guardhouse of the Emperor, the Palace of Arms, etc.) which are all nearby. The platforms were two hundred meters long and were covered for a hundred metres. The entrance had a porch with a pointed roof supported by four pillars and surmounted by a double-headed eagle decorated with kokoshniks. The interior of the pavilion is adorned with frescoes imitating 16th-century Moscovite frescoes, carried out by the artists of the Moscow workshop of the "Heirs of P. P. Pashkov" under the supervision of its co-owner Nikolai Pavlovich Pashkov.

=== Current Condition ===
After the October Revolution of 1917, the station was renamed "Uritsky Pavilion" after Moisey Uritsky in 1918 and closed a few years after the Second World War. The pavilion itself suffered from damage during the German occupation.

During the 1990s the building was used as an unofficial disco until it suffered a fire.

On 18 March 2008, the Property Fund held tenders for the sale of rights to conclude lease agreements for the pavilion building, which was to be named "Tsarskoye Selo Station" (Pushkin, Academic Ave, 35b, lit. A). The auction winner was OOO Sansara, which concluded the contract for a period of 49 years. The possible use of the building was as a shopping mall or restaurant.

In 2010 on the 300th anniversary of Tsarskoe Selo, it was planned to restore the pavilion. But this did not happen.

The pavilion is currently almost in ruins. The sharp-pointed roof of the entrance door of honor has collapsed and been replaced with plastic coated roofing sheet. The stone carvings on the facade have survived, as well as the murals of the vaults of the front porch and some interiors have also survived. Bullet holes and shrapnel holes from the Second World War are visible on the rear / north façade where the platforms used to be. The platforms and platform canopy no longer exist.

=== Models ===
A company called Umnaya Bumaga, OOO/ "Clever Paper" produced a 1:150 card/paper model of the station building.

== Gallery ==
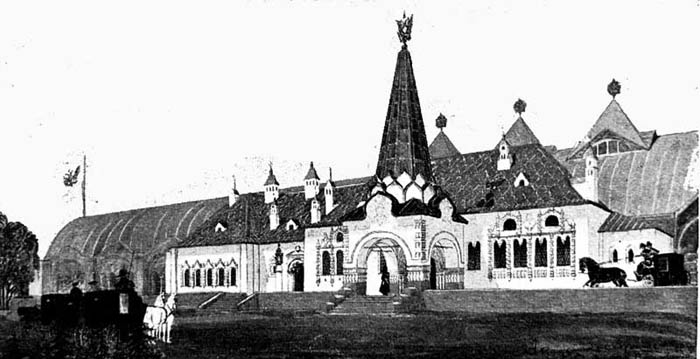
Tsarskoye Selo Imperial Station 1913

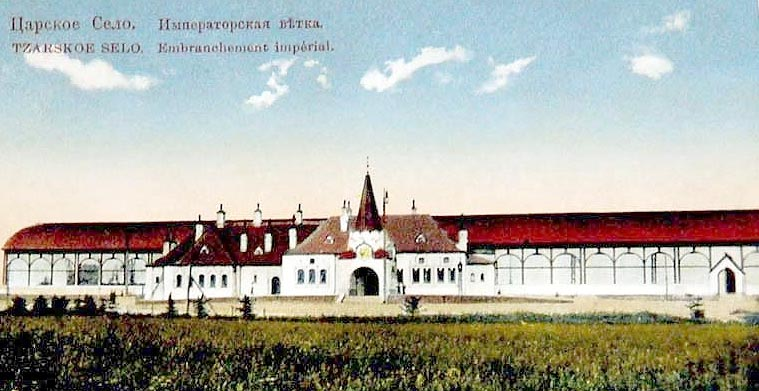
Tsarskoye Selo Imperial Station 1910s

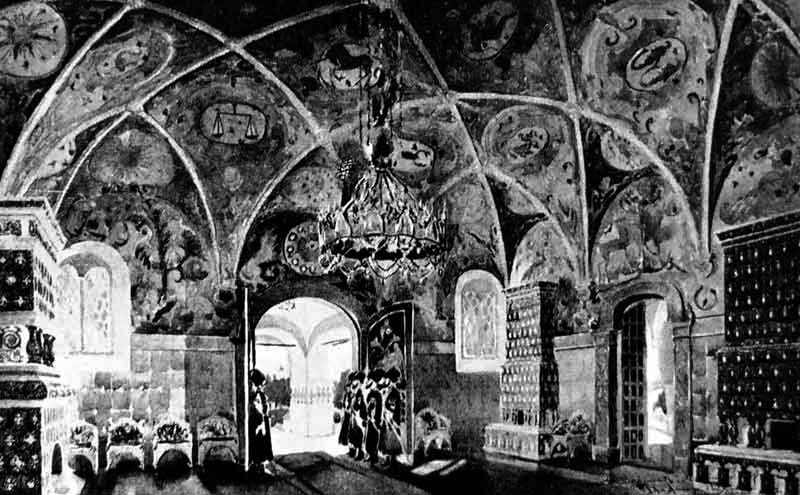
Tsarskoye Selo Imperial Station Interior 1910s

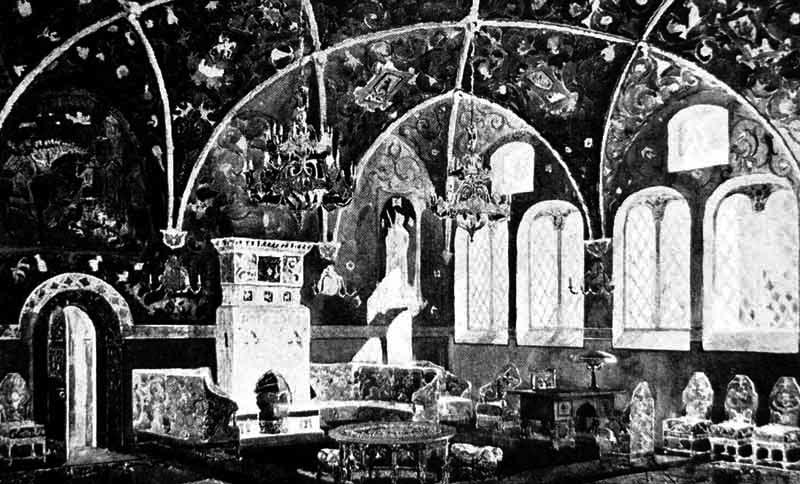
Tsarskoye Selo Imperial Station Interior 1910s

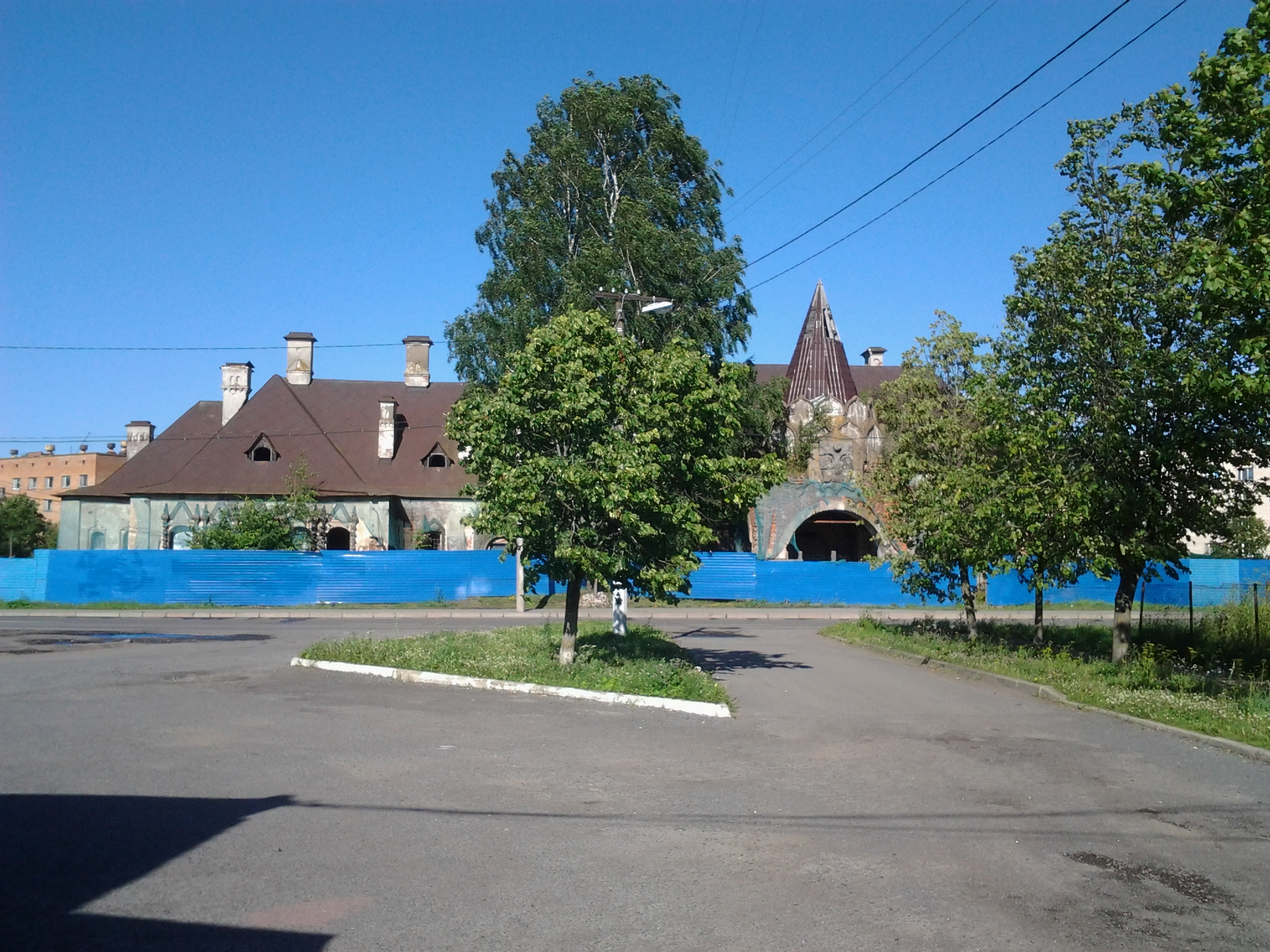
Tsarskoye Selo Imperial Station from West - Main Facade 30.07.17

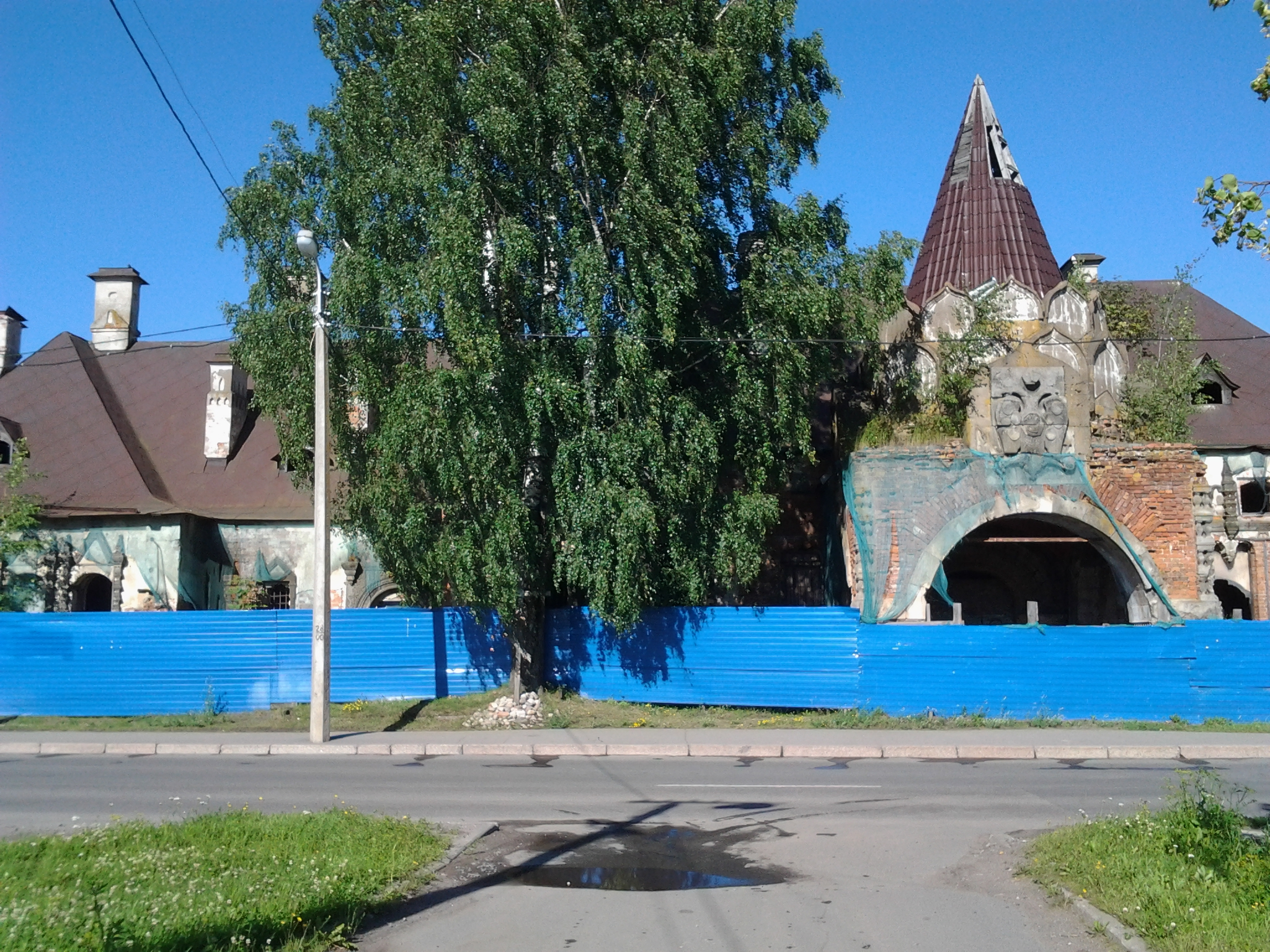
Tsarskoye Selo Imperial Station from West - Main Facade and entrance porch 30.07.17

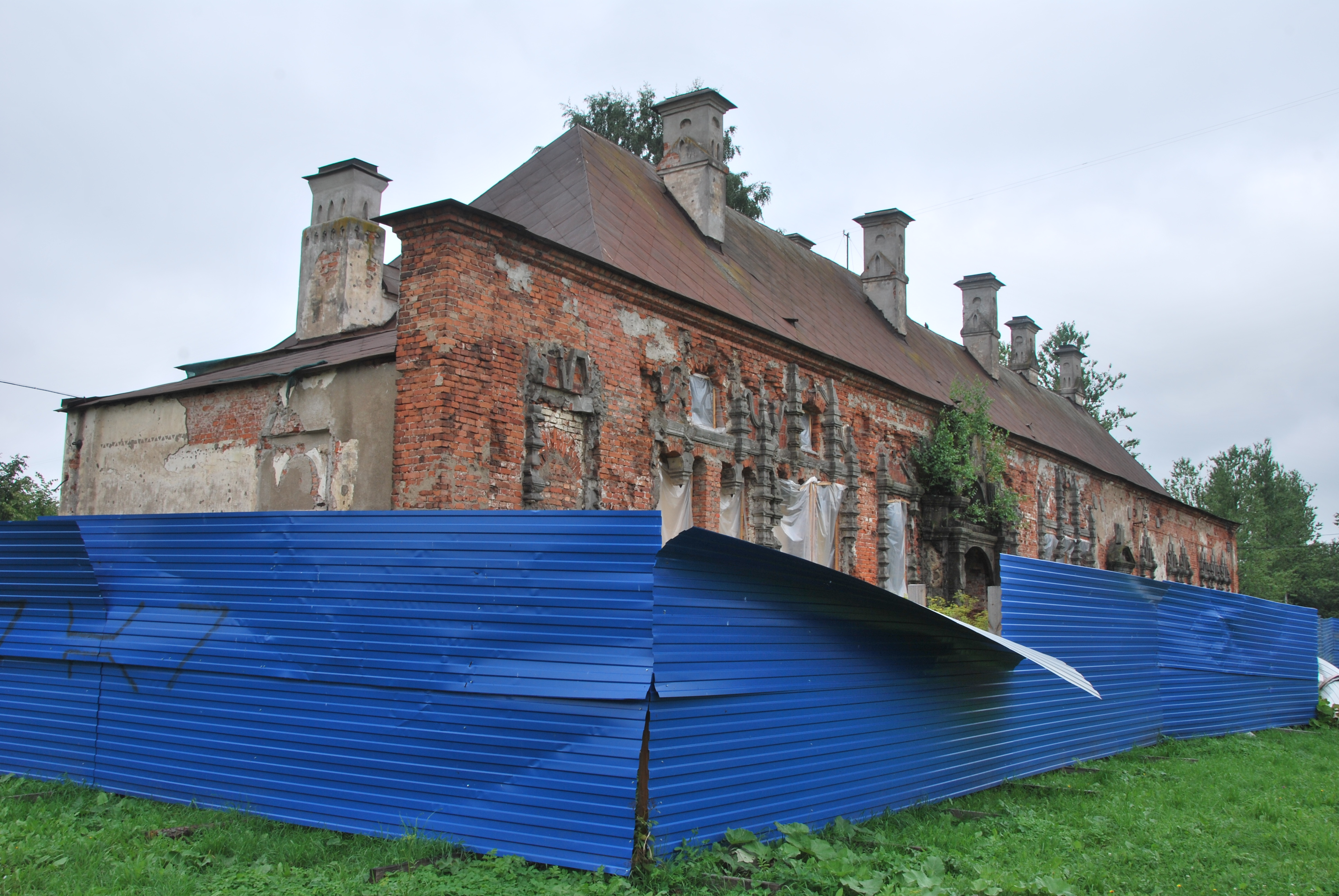
Tsarskoye Selo Imperial Station 2011 from North East

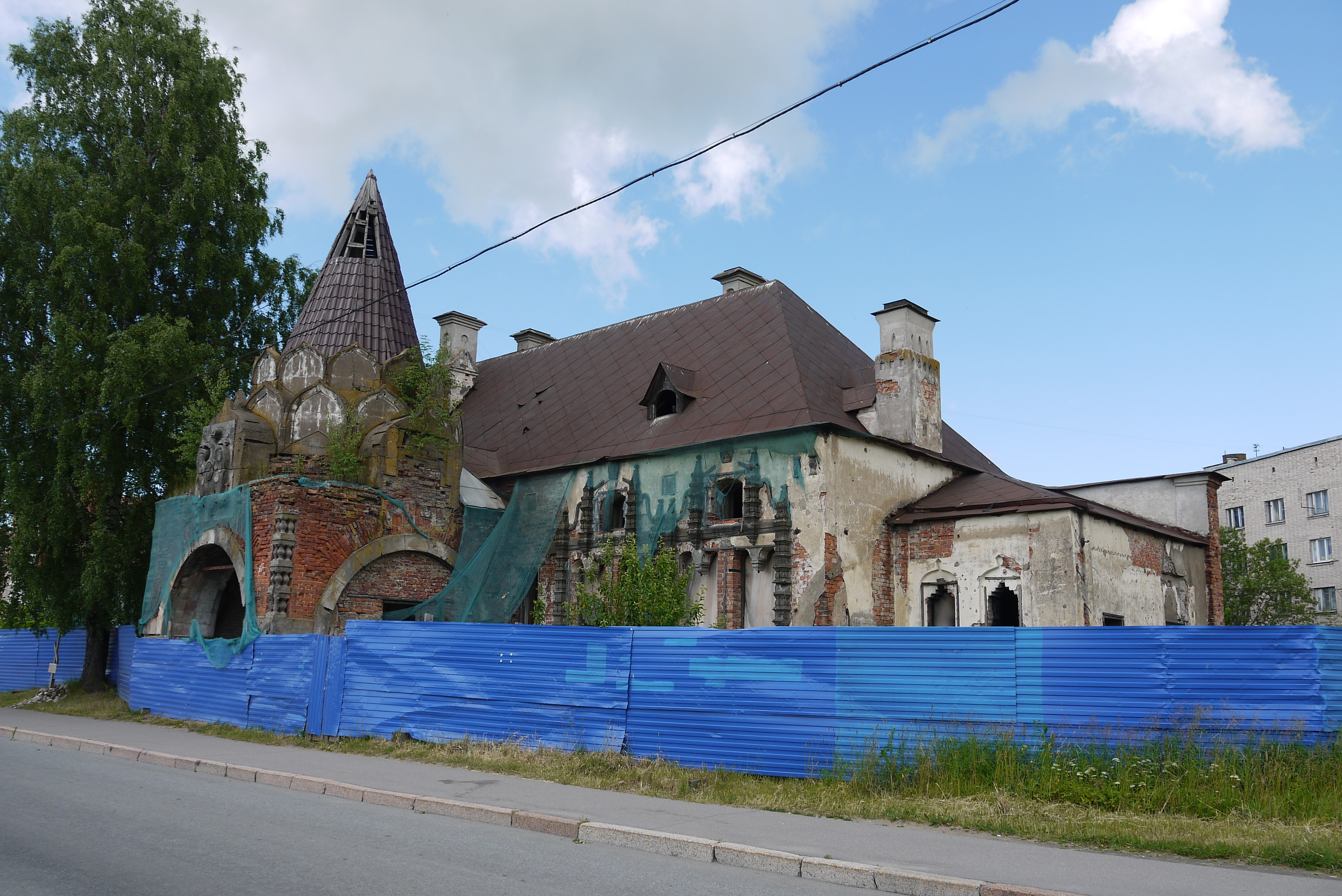
Tsarskoye Selo Imperial Station 2015 from South East

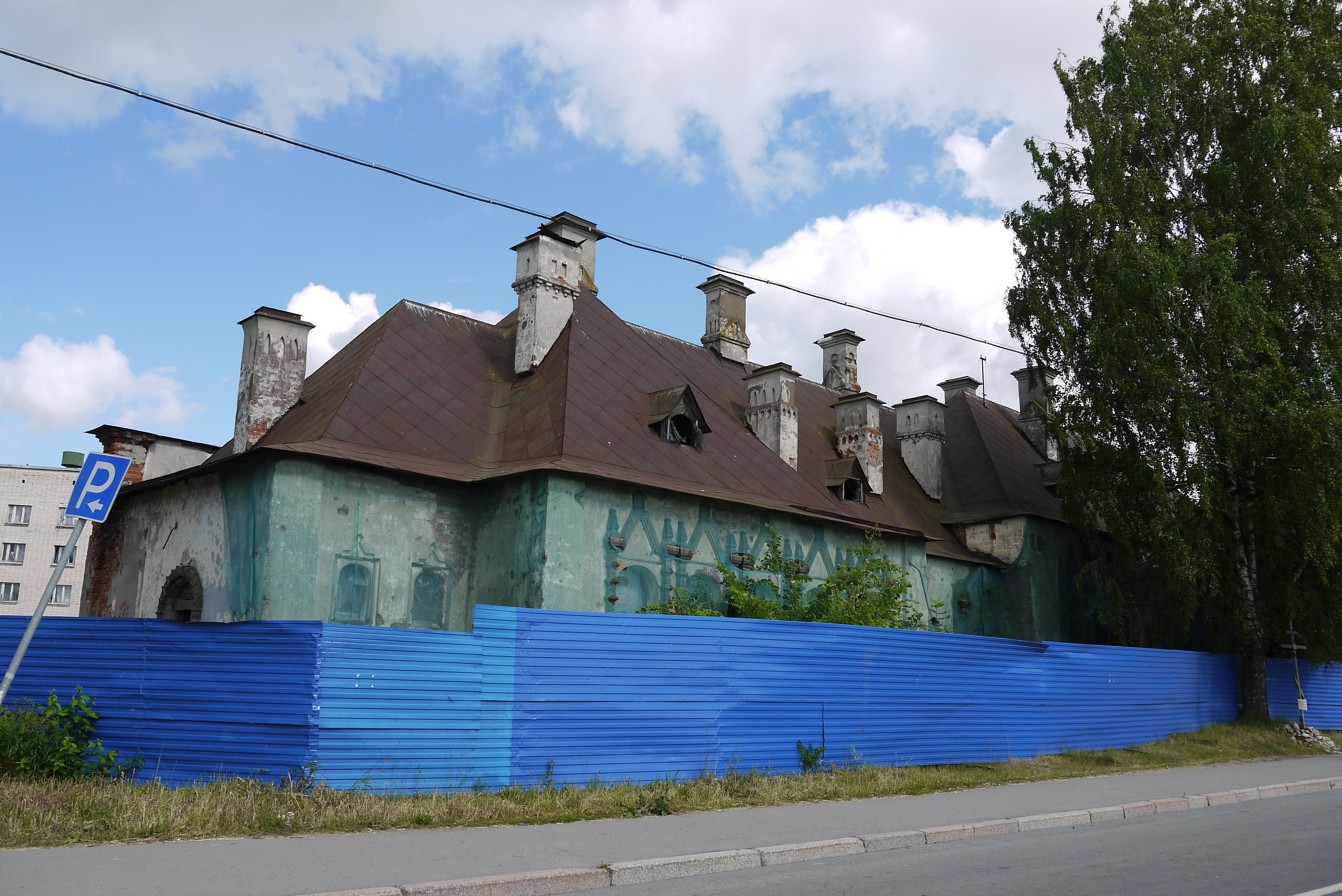
Tsarskoye Selo Imperial Station 2015 from South West

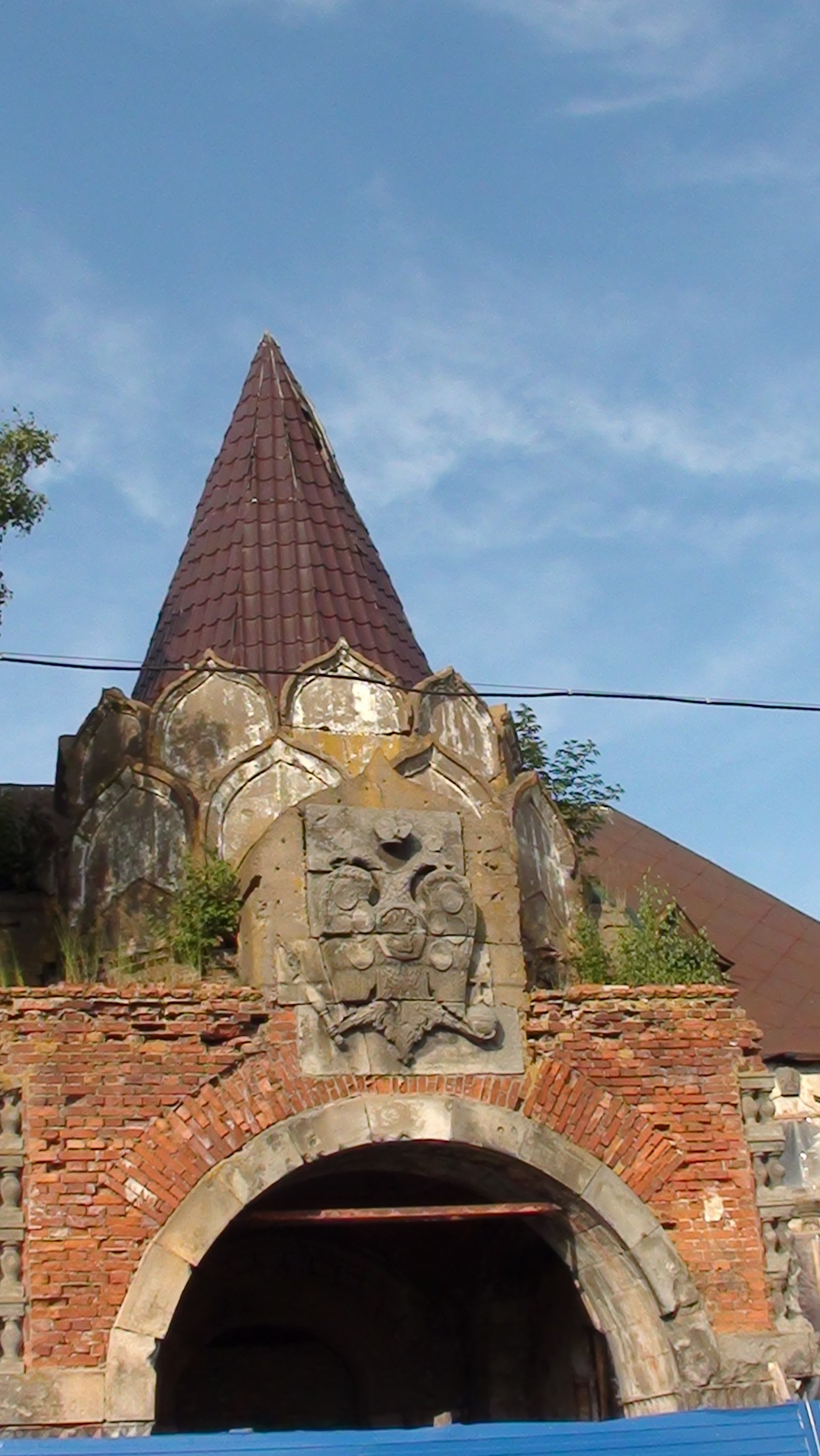
Tsarskoye Selo Imperial Station in 2011 Front Porch Exterior

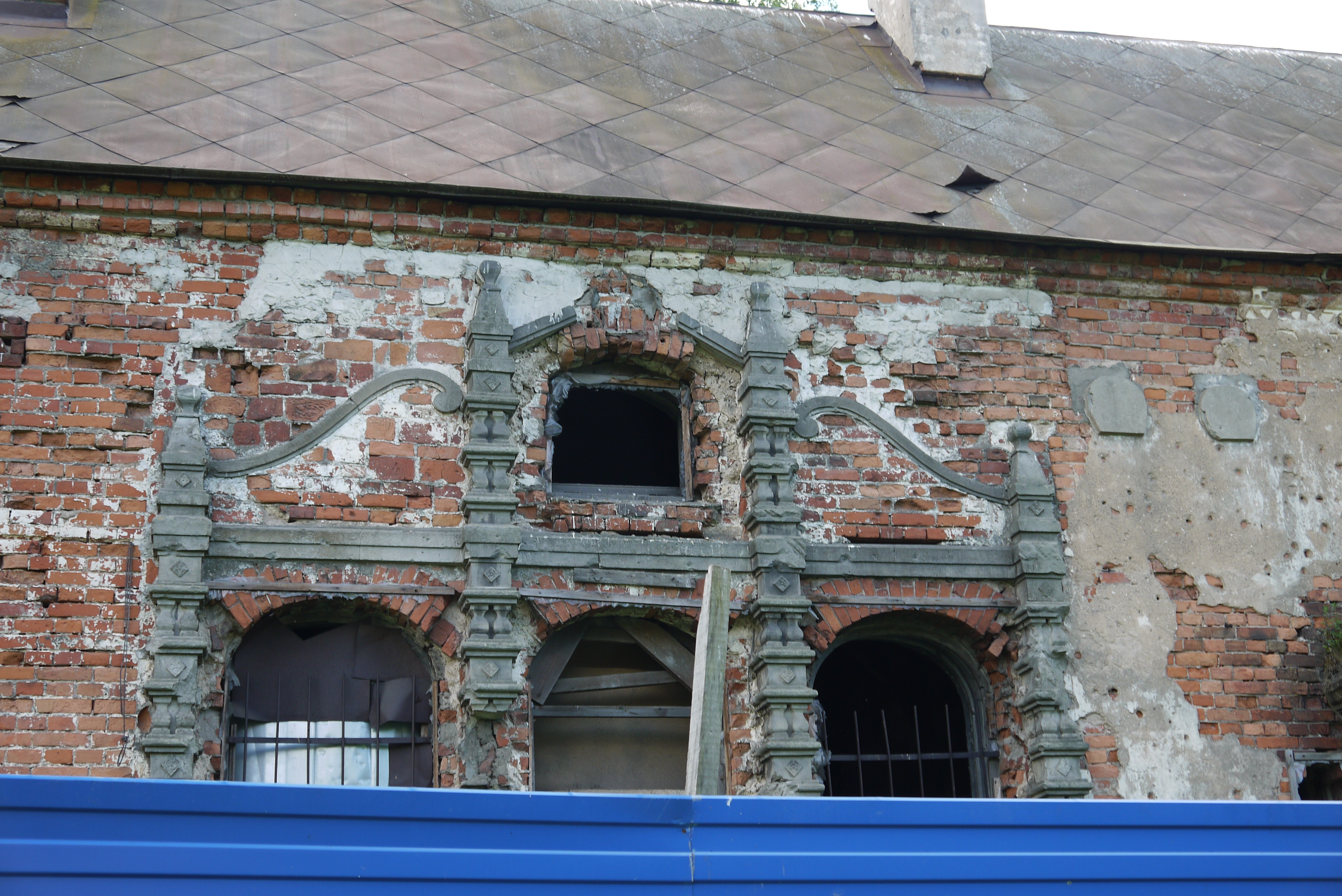
Tsarskoye Selo Imperial Station in 2015 window details on north platform side

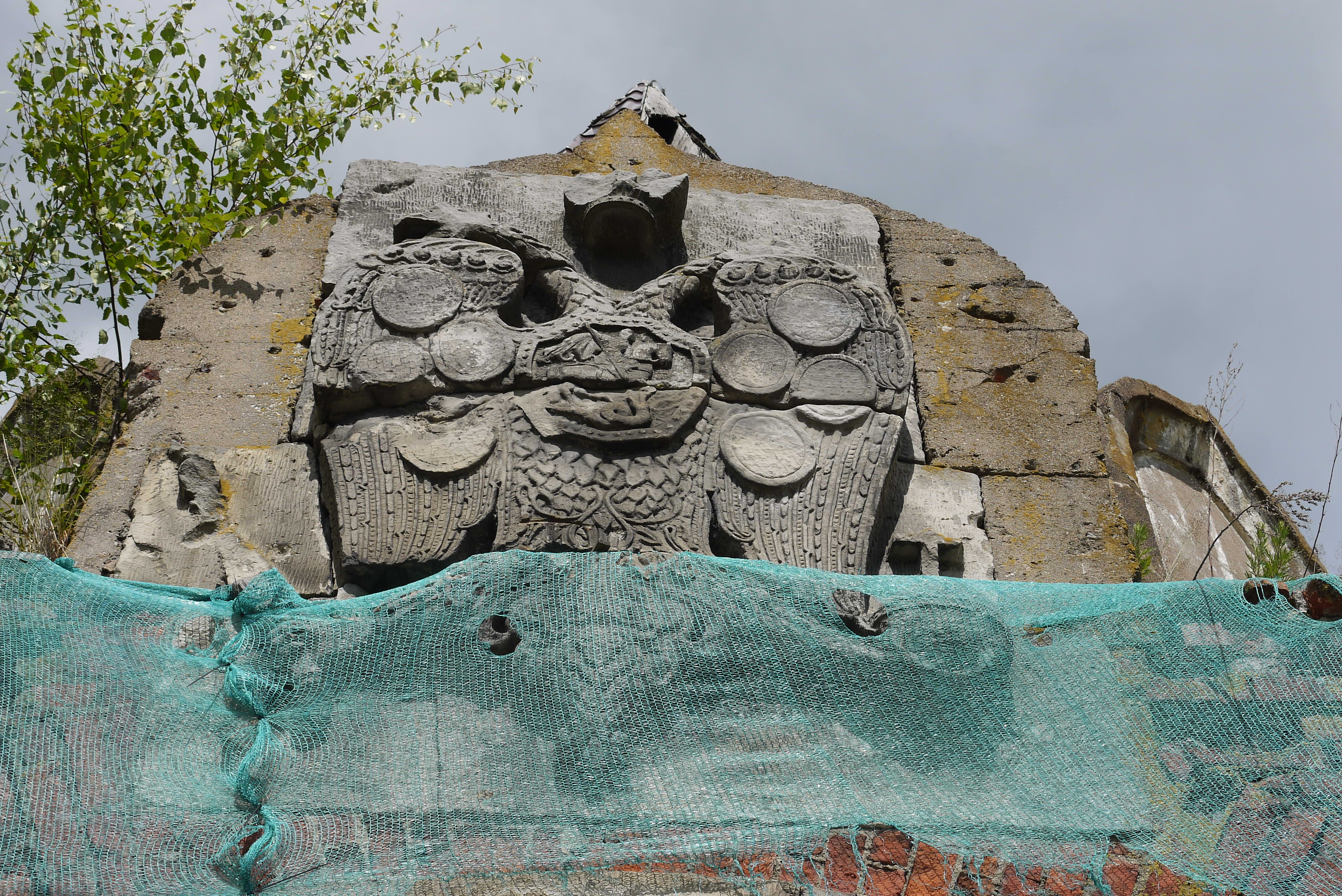
Tsarskoye Selo Imperial Station in 2015 Imperial eagle detail south elevation

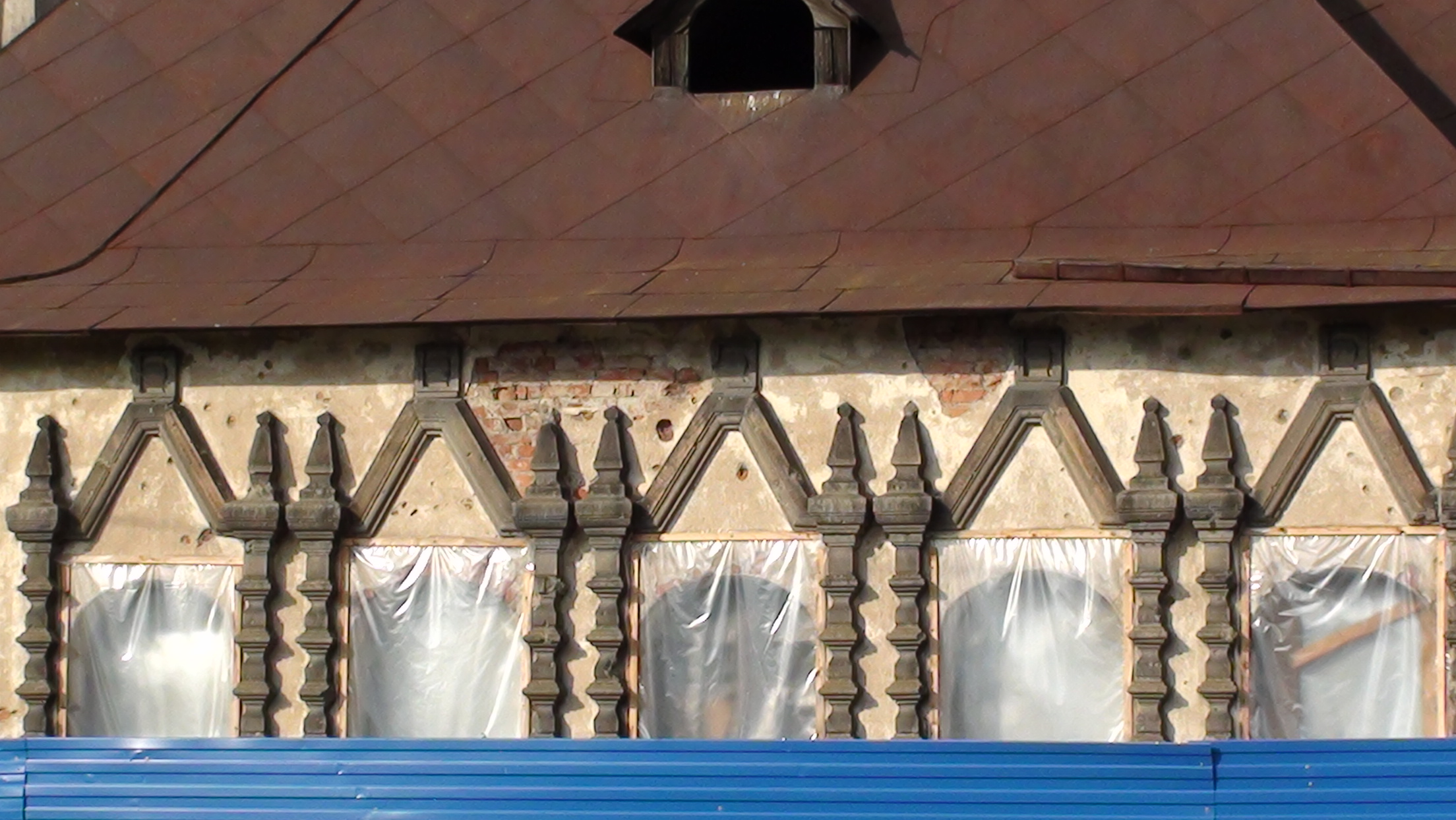
Tsarskoye Selo Imperial Station in 2011 applied detail south elevation

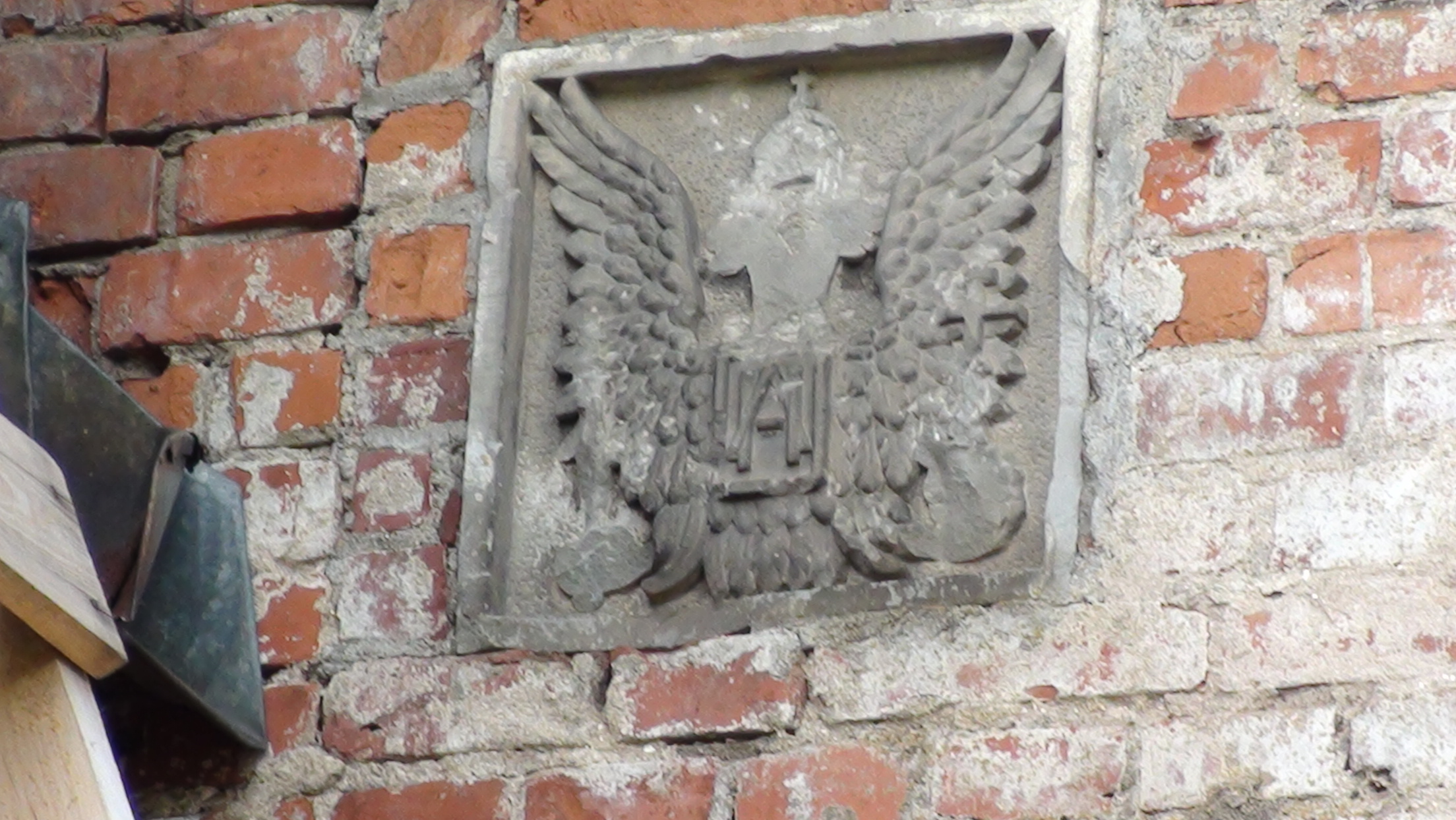
Tsarskoye Selo Imperial Station in 2011 Imperial eagle detail

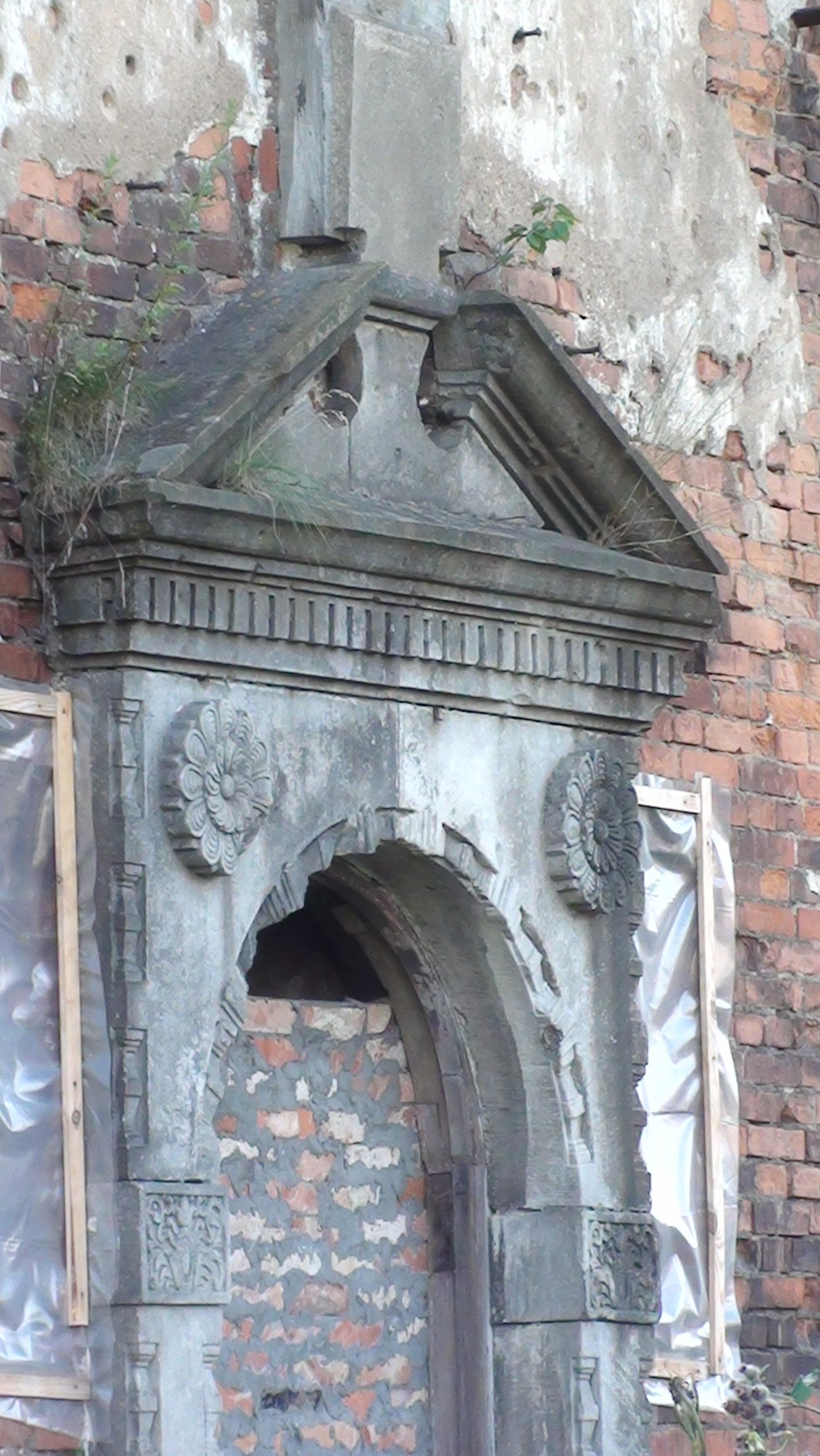
Tsarskoye Selo Imperial Station in 2011 stone door surround

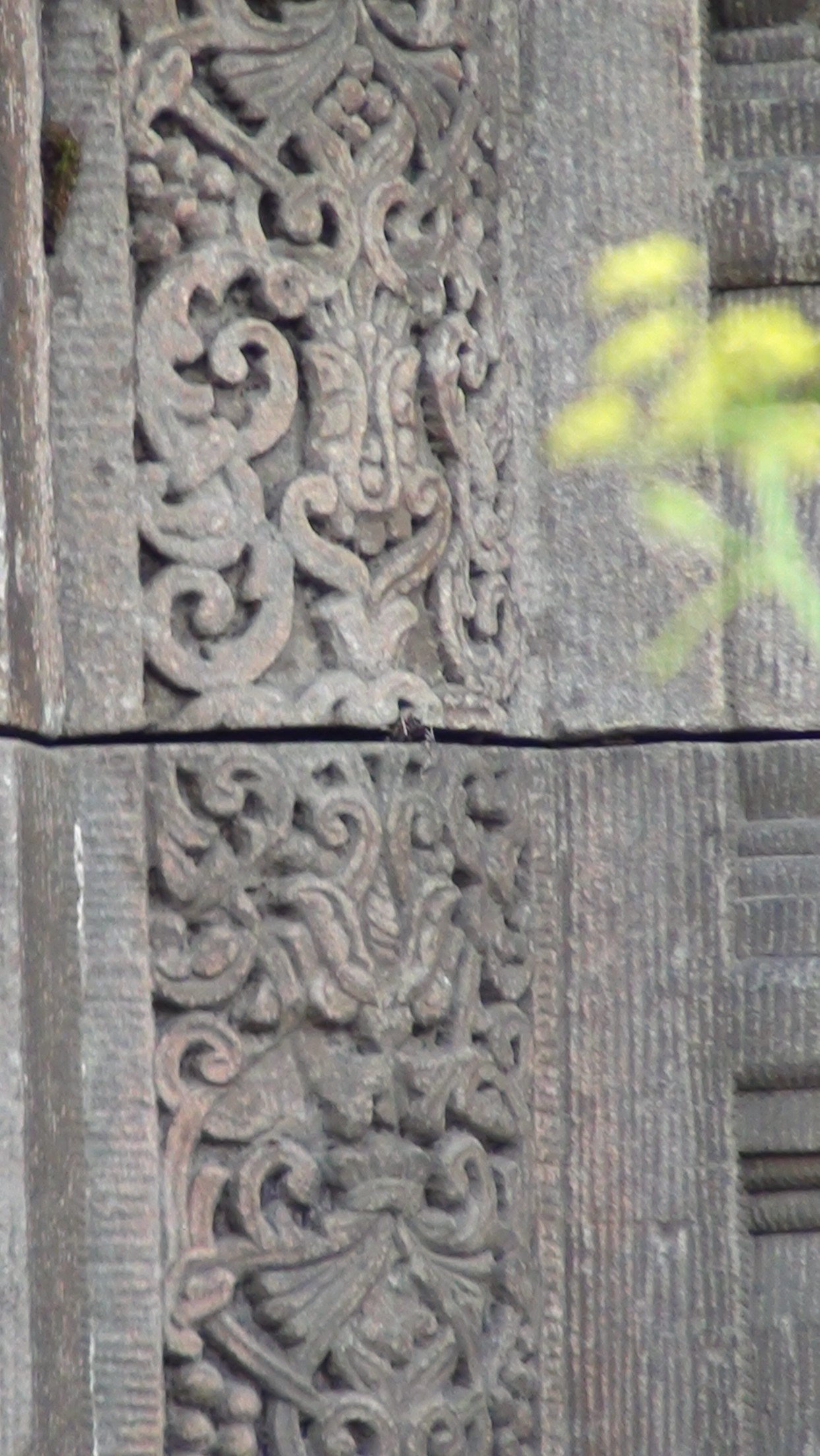
Tsarskoye Selo Imperial Station in 2011 exterior stone carving

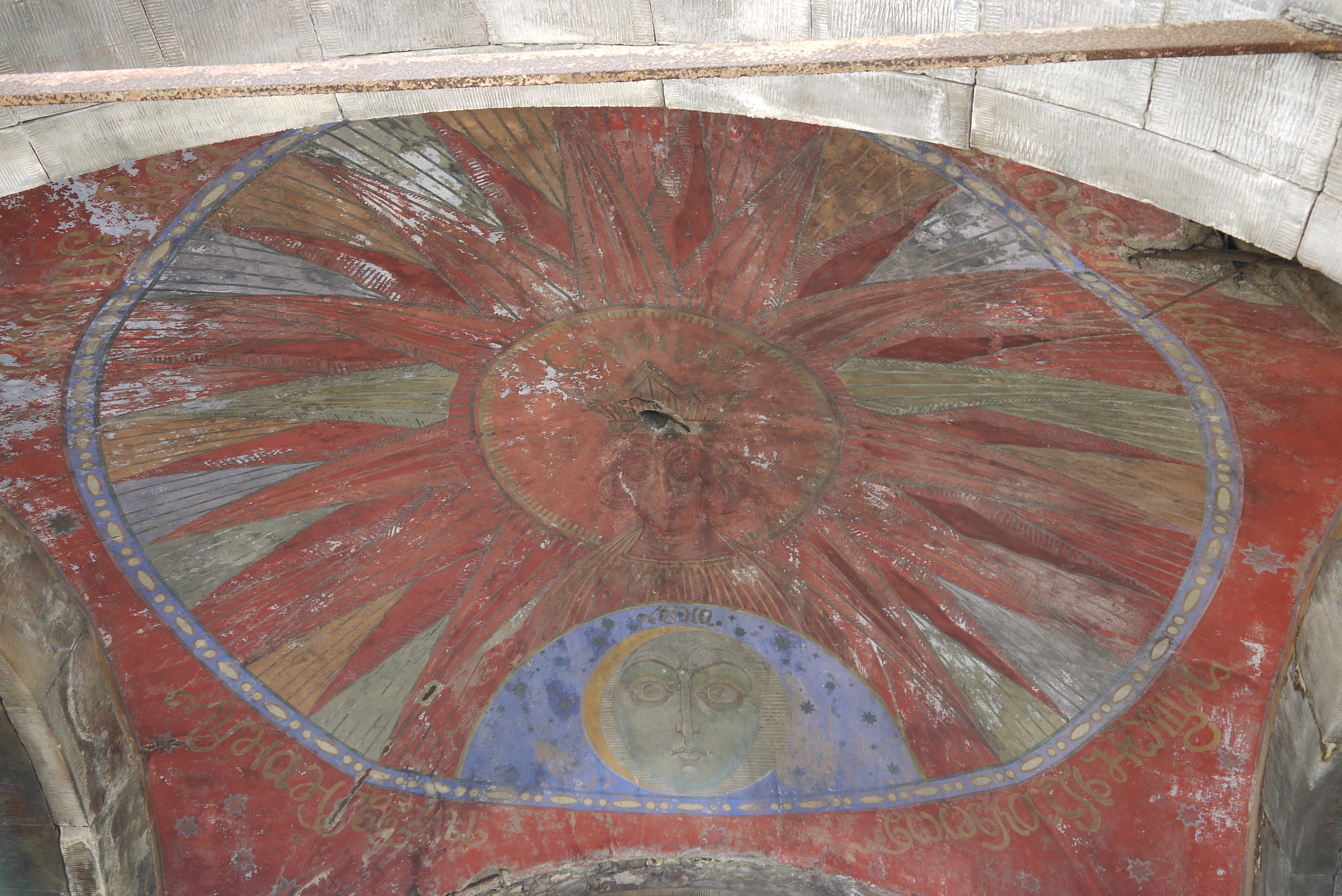
Tsarskoye Selo Imperial Station in 2015 porch ceiling

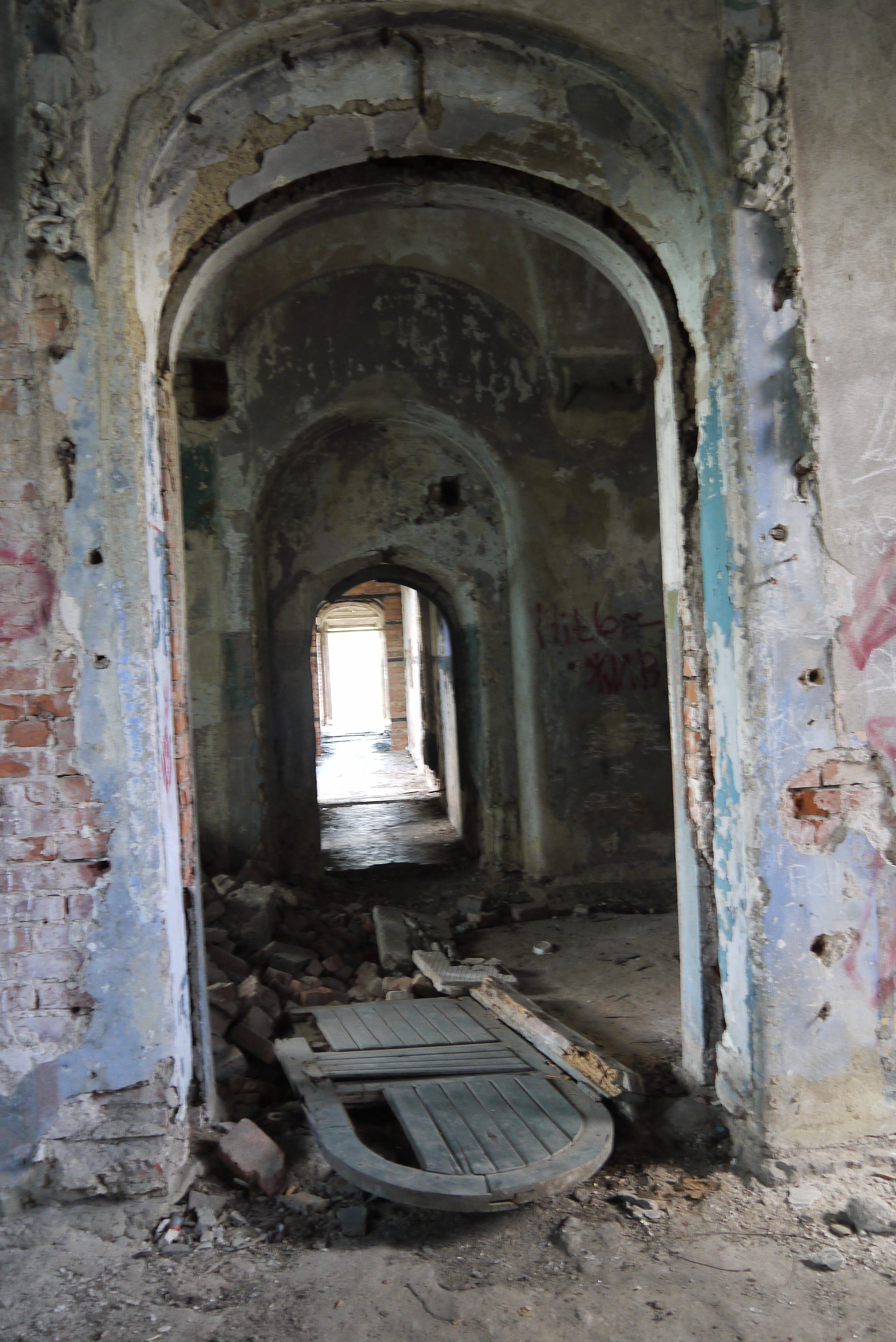
Tsarskoye Selo Imperial Station in 2015 interior

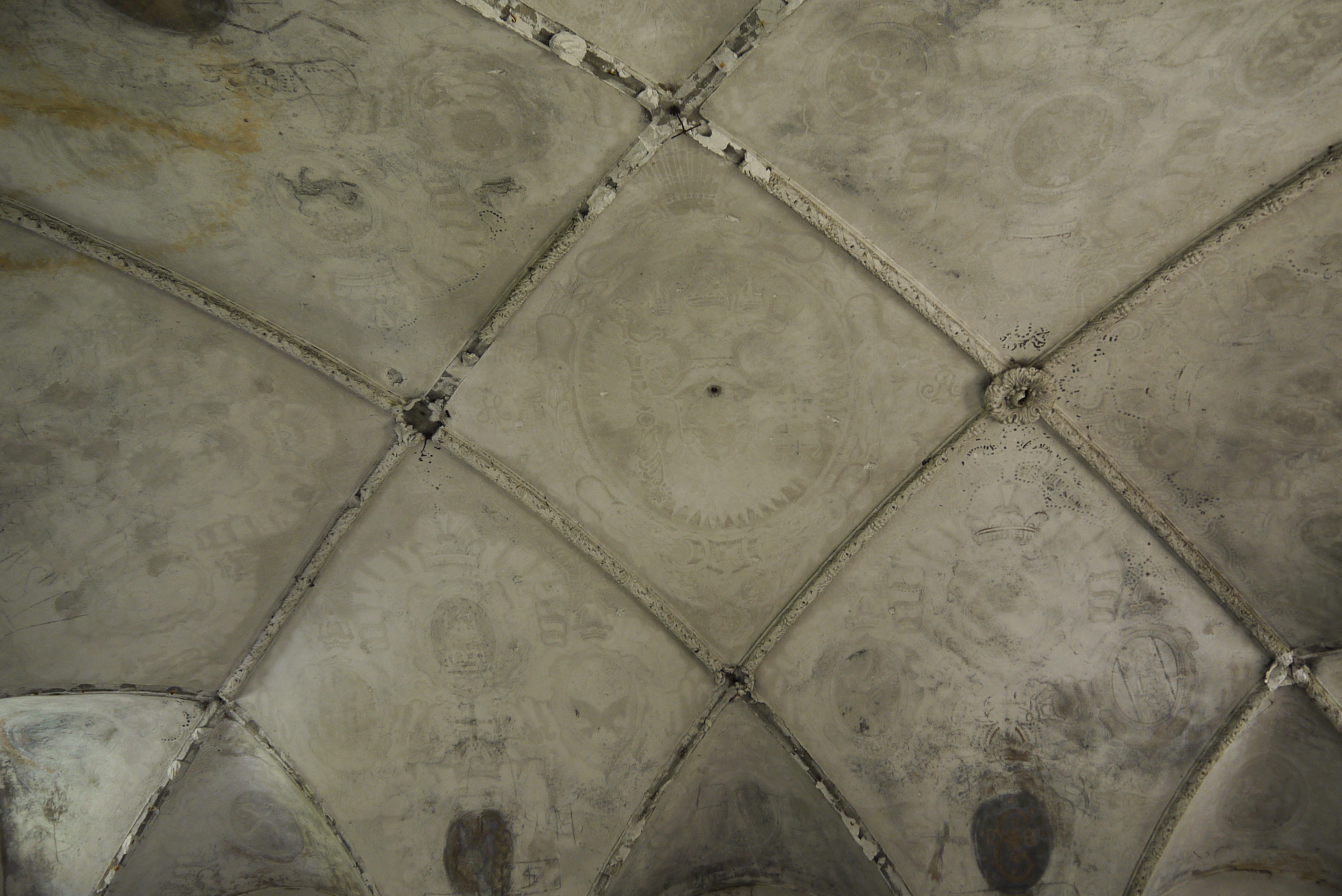
Tsarskoye Selo Imperial Station in 2015 interior

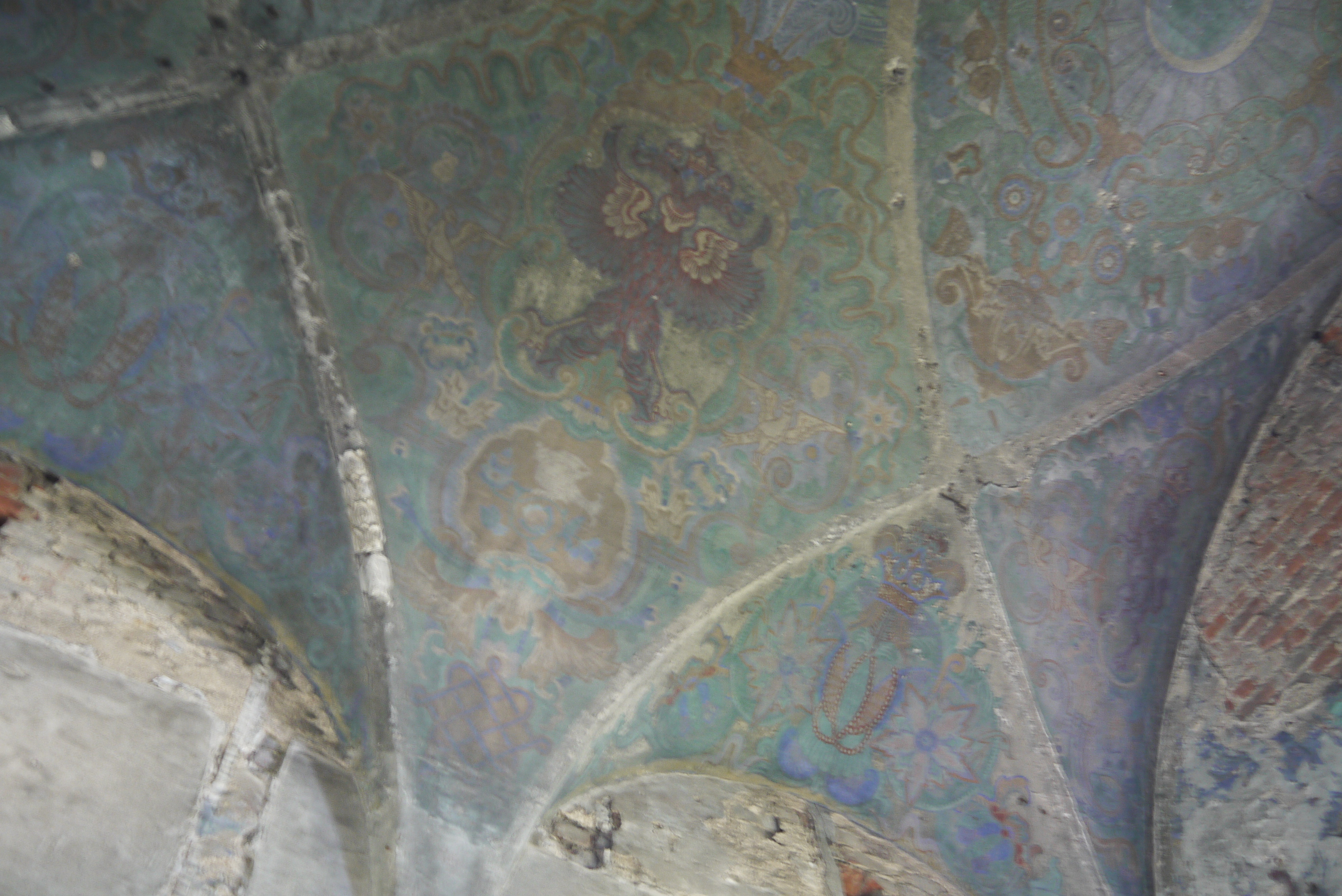
Tsarskoye Selo Imperial Station in 2015 interior

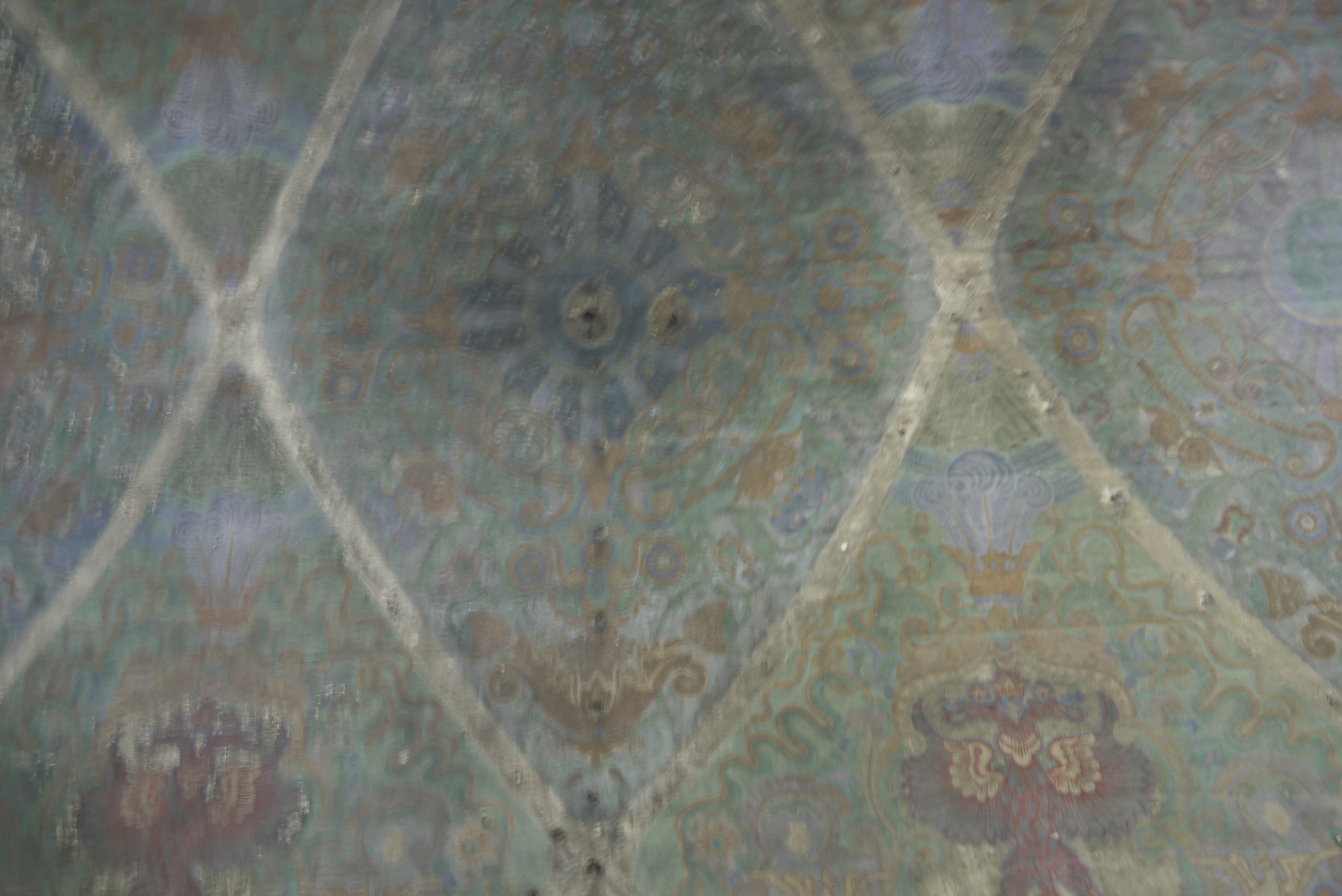
Tsarskoye Selo Imperial Station in 2015 interior

== See also ==
- Tsarskoye Selo
- Pushkin, Saint Petersburg
- Tsarskoye Selo Railway
- The Museum of the Moscow Railway
- Moscow Rizhskaya railway station
- History of rail transport in Russia
- Russian Railway Museum, in St.Petersburg
- Martial Chamber
