= Ratnaya Palata =

World War I museum building in Pushkin, Saint Petersburg, Russia

Martial Chamber
- Ратная палата
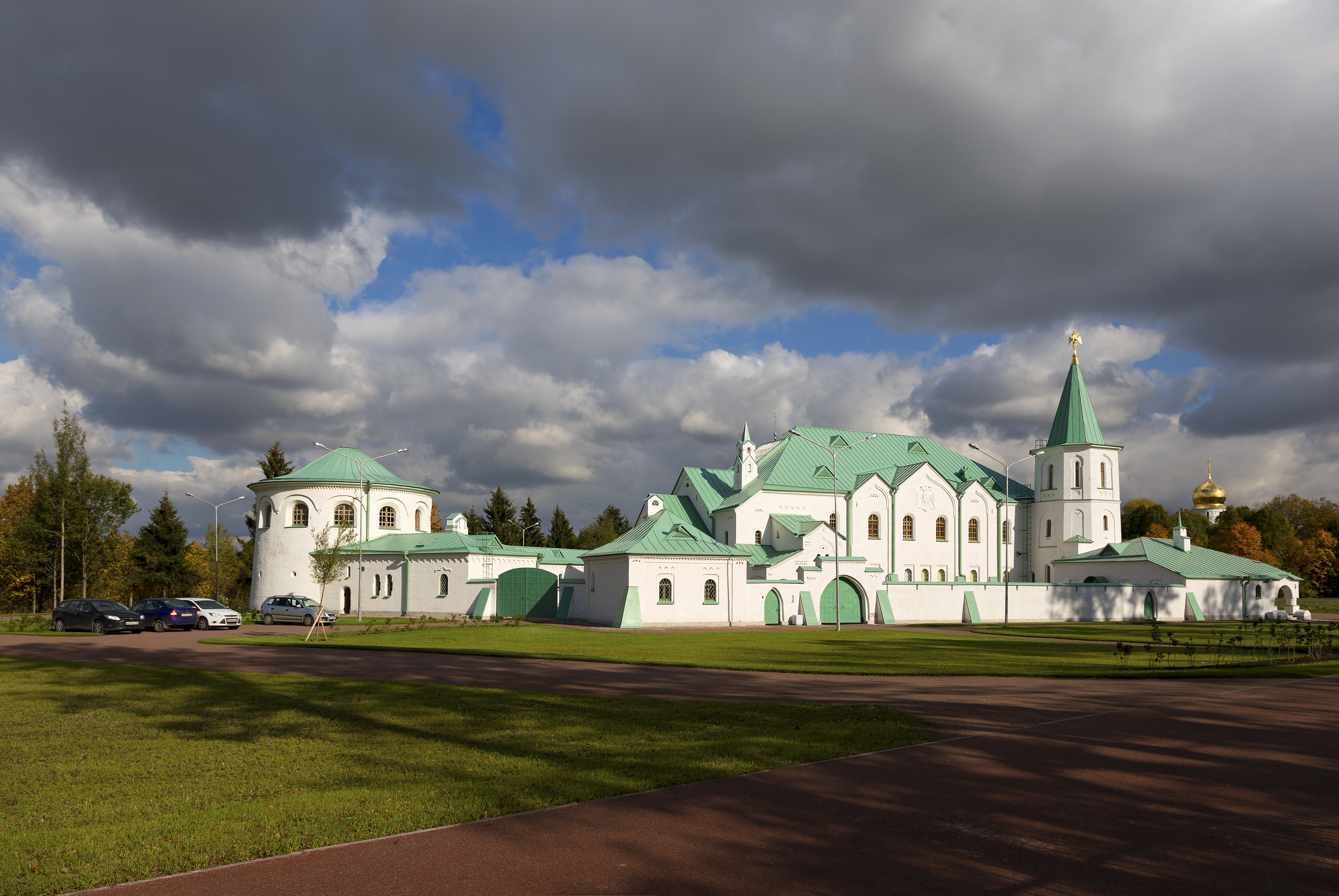
- Ratnaya Palata in Tsarskoye Selo
- Interactive map of the Martial Chamber area
- Alternative names: Государева Ратная палата (The Sovereign's Martial Chamber)

General information
- Status: Russia's Cultural Heritage Item, used as a museum
- Architectural style: Russian Revival architecture
- Location: Pushkin, Saint Petersburg, 5 Fermskaya doroga, Pushkin, Saint Petersburg, Russia, Russia
- Coordinates: 59°43′31.4″N 30°23′10.63″E
- Groundbreaking: 1913

Design and construction
- Architect: Semyon Sidorchuk(bio in English)

Website
- Martial Chamber Website

Ratnaya Palata (Russian: Ратная палата /rAht-naya pah-LAh-tah/ "Martial Chamber") is Russia's World War I museum building in Pushkin town near Saint Petersburg, Russia. Designed for Romanov royal dynasty's 300th anniversary in Russian Revival architecture style together with the buildings of the church campus of the Sovereign's Cathedral of the Icon of Our Lady of Saint Theodore and the private royal railway terminal. Suggested, not long before World War I, to be built as a museum of Russian war history, based on Elena Tretyakova's collection gift, the exhibition content, when the war was already under way in 1915, was focused by Emperor Nicholas II on then current heroic deeds of Russian warriors, but the display, at first shown in the St Petersburg Admiralty building, opened in Martial Chamber for only a short time before the end of Russian Empire in February 1917, and was closed down a year later by Soviet authorities. Having been used after that for unrelated purposes, the Martial Chamber building was legally transferred to the Tsarskoye Selo Museum complex in 2008 and was cleared, restored, given a new collection of exhibits and reopened as modern Russia's first museum of World War I by the centennial of its beginning in August 2014. The exhibition is titled "Russia in the Great War" after a name for the war used at the time of its battles.

== History ==
=== Background ===
Russia has had a long history and became an empire in the early 18 century, with Peter the Great's victory over Sweden in Great Northern War. Within the newly captured lands by the Baltic Sea he set up the new capital of Russia, Saint Petersburg. He and subsequent monarchs commissioned building of royal palaces in the city and around it, for winter and summer use. Members of the royal family often had their own estates, and Peter's second wife Catherine, who after death became Empress Catherine I of Russia, had her countryside manor in a southern suburb of the capital called Tsarskoye Selo, the Russian for Royal Village, renamed in the Soviet years after the national poet Alexander Pushkin because he spent his youth as a student and started writing in its boarding school the Emperor's Lyceum.

The main estate was further developed by her namesake Catherine the Great in the second half of 18 century and is known as Catherine's Palace and Park, and adjoining grounds were given by Catherine II to her oldest grandson Alexander, future Alexander I of Russia whose army eventually won in the 1812 Napoleonic War, for his wedding. The complex served as a royal summertime residence throughout 19 century.

The secluded Alexander Palace and Park became permanent home for the country's last Emperor Nicholas II of Russia, his wife and children during the last 13 years of his reign, making it very important in the county's life. He lost his crown at the height of World War I to the second Russian Revolution - of February 1917. It was from this palace that he and his family were transported after the October Revolution under arrest to the Urals where they were executed. But back in 1914 when World War I broke out, Russian involvement against German and Austriam empires on the side of fellow Slavic people of the Balkans was popular.

==== Our Lady of Saint Theodore's Campus ====
Nicholas II commissioned building of a church that became his family chapel, with outbuildings for clergy to live in and Martial Chamber, all planned in a Russian style of 17 century Yaroslavl city (Russian Revival architecture), on the grounds of the Emperor's Farm Park bordering Alexander Park, and the construction of the complex began in 1913 and went on until 1917-18. The church was named after the Romanov royal family's patron icon Feodorovskaya Icon of the Mother of God (Our Lady of Saint Theodore), and the group of buildings ([church] campus, Rus. gorodok) after it. (Feodor is the church form and Fyodor the colloquial Russian form of the name Theodore, and Fyodorovskaya is the derivative possessive/relative adjective meaning Theodore's). The first monarch from the Romanov dynasty Michael of Russia was blessed on coronation with this icon, and the church dedication as well as the campus' 17-century Russian style were chosen to mark the 1913's tricentennial of the ruling royal house, whose ascension to power signified the end of the Time of Troubles. Another church of the same name and in Old Russian style to mark the royal dynasty 300th anniversary was built as suggested by a clergyman to be built in Central Saint Petersburg next to the train station for communication with Moscow.

The campus included the Sovereign's Cathedral of the Icon of Our Lady of Saint Theodore, Whitestone Chamber for the priests of the Cathedral, Pink Chamber for deacons, Yellow Chamber for clerks, White Chamber for the lower staff, Refectory (architect Stephen Krichinskiy), and Martial Chamber. The Alexander estate under Nicholas II received its own railway line from Saint Petersburg for royal family usage and its own train station built in the same Russian Revival style - Emperor's Pavilion. Not far away the same architectural taste showed in the stone building of His Majesty's Own Convoy Barracks.

=== Creation of Museum ===
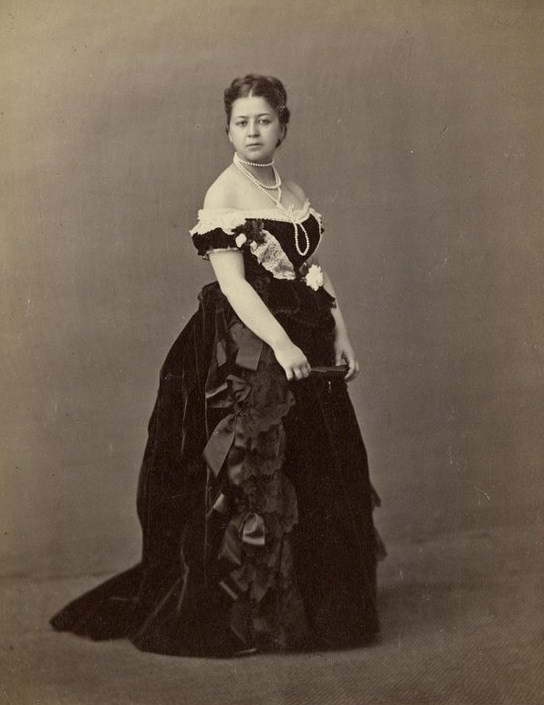
Elena Tretyakova (Rus.), the 1911 initiator of the Russian war history museum, who gave it its founding collection, financed the construction of Martial Chamber and became its director and curator

Conceived in 1911 as the museum of Russian military history based on the exhibits offer of Elena Tretyakova (Rus.), the widow of a Russian entrepreneur and art collector Sergei Tretyakov, brother of the founder of the Moscow-based Tretyakov Gallery, the edifice started to be built only a year before World War I, in 1913; converted to the national exhibition of the current military conflict stressing Russian heroism and achievements, it opened just before the downfall of Russian monarchy in February 1917 and closed two years later. The building then served various other purposes, and the museum of World War I was reopened in the building only as late as 2014, after three years of undergoing restoration, because in the Soviet Union the first world war was neglected as a conflict between imperialist powers unlike its consequences such as the Russian Revolution of October 1917 and the Civil War in Russia (1918-1921). Modern Russia has an interest in continuity of the national history, as shown in the combination of its anthem, flag and arms.

==== Layout of the original museum ====
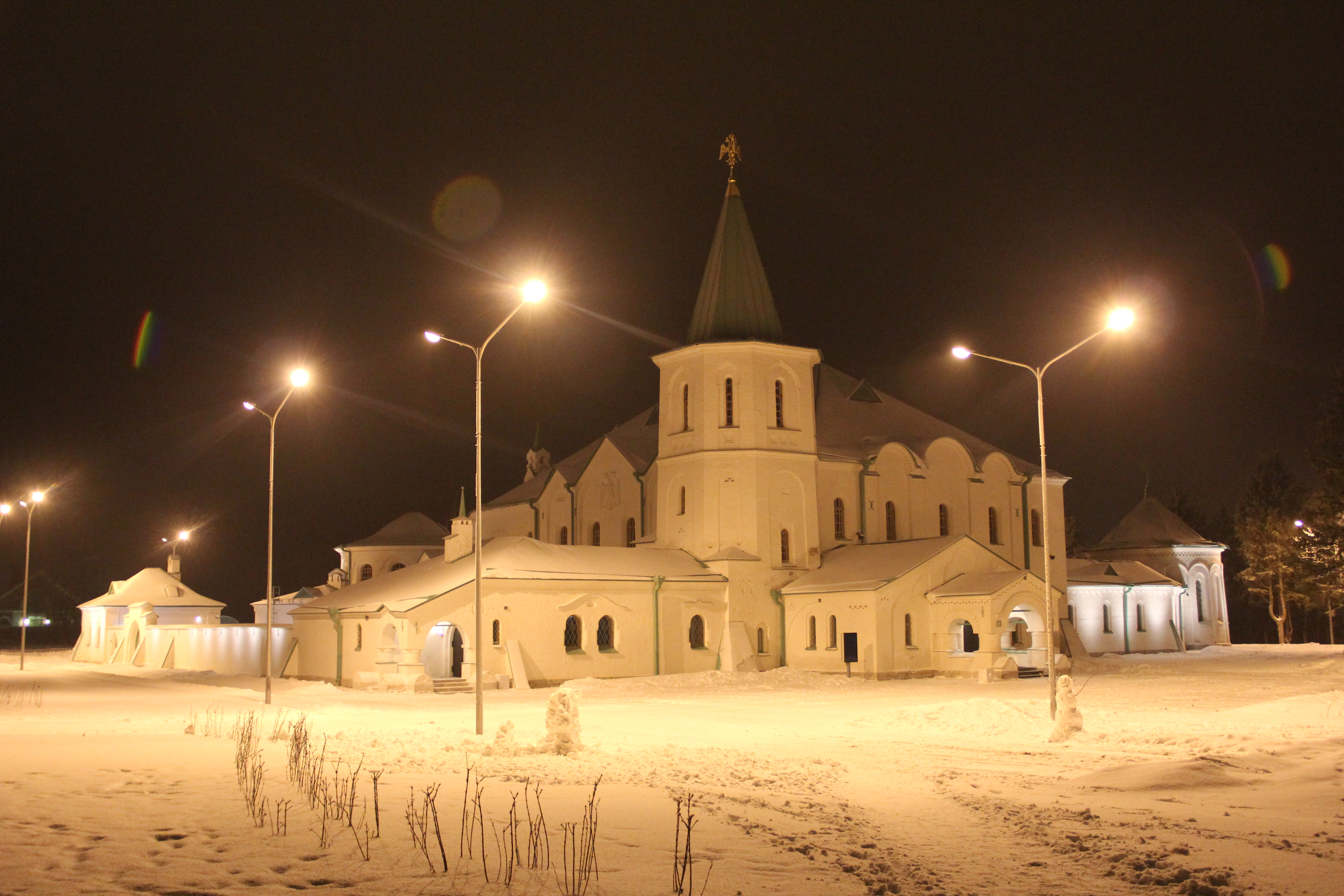
Present-day evening winter view of Martial Chamber

The building was erected in 1913-1917 to resemble an Old Russian fort and contain a museum of Russian military history, so in 1914 it was given a medieval-sounding name Rus. Gosudareva Ratnaya palata (The Sovereign's Martial Chamber). Its architect was Semyon Sidorchuk. For the holding of the museum's collections were allocated a one-story well-lit gallery and the two smaller towers. The third, larger tower was to contain bulky exhibits. The two-story great hall was intended as a 400-seat lecture room and film demonstration auditorium. During World War I the museum received portraits of the first Russian soldiers awarded with St George's Cross in this war. Various war trophies were brought here from battlefields, such as captured enemy weapons and equipment. Large cannons and even an airplane were placed in the inner courtyard.

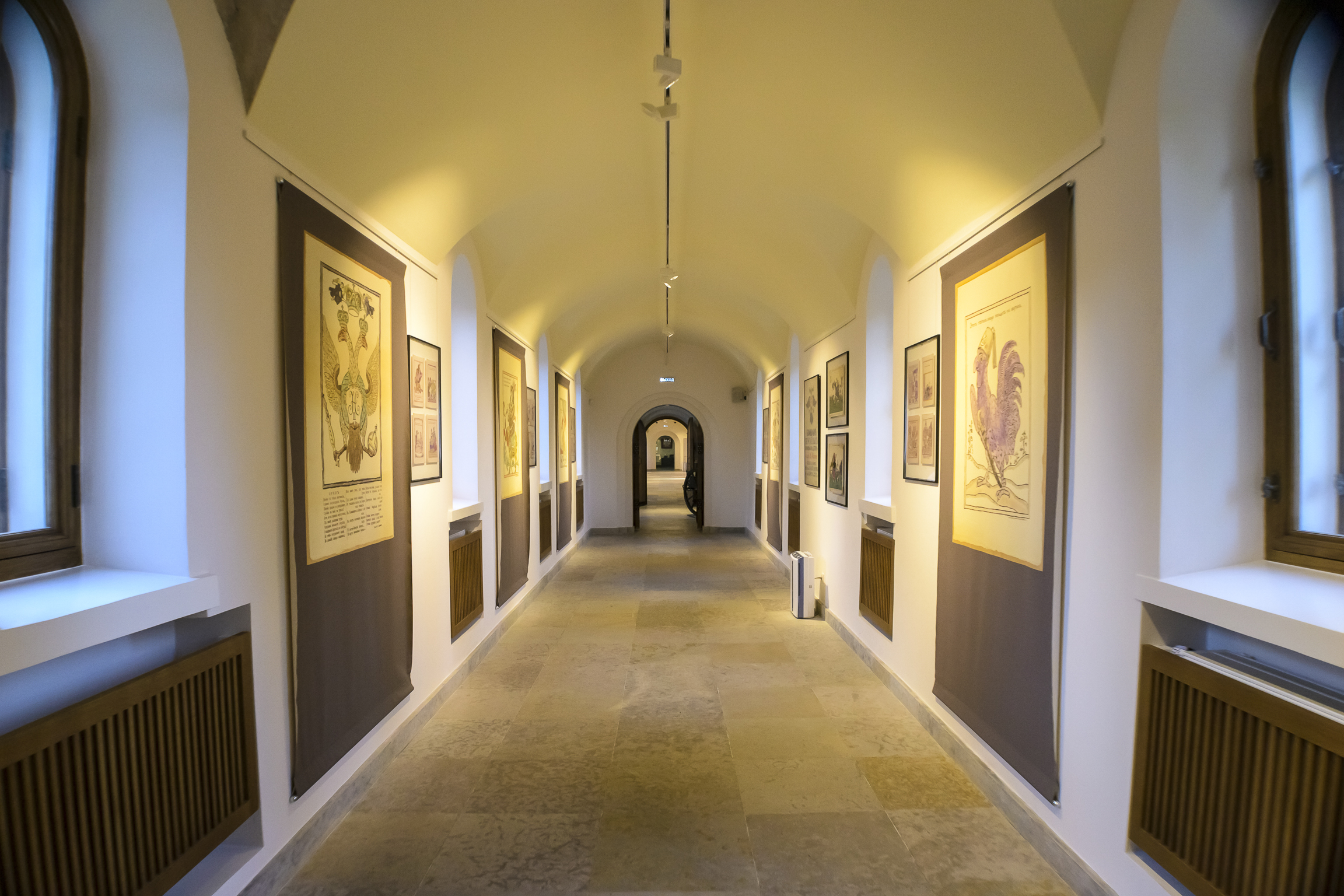
Part of modern indoor exhibition

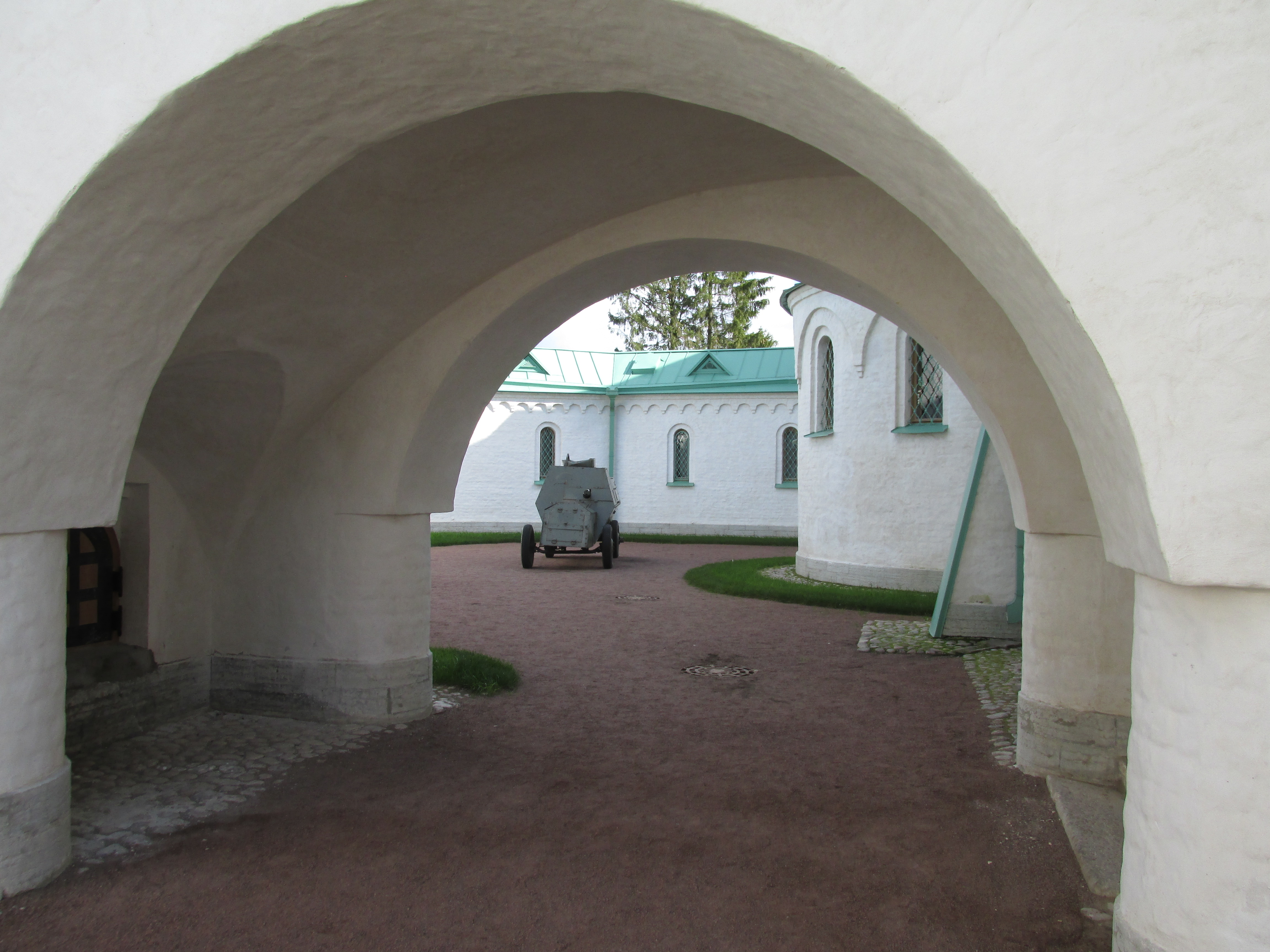
Inner courtyard in 2014. Martial Chamber

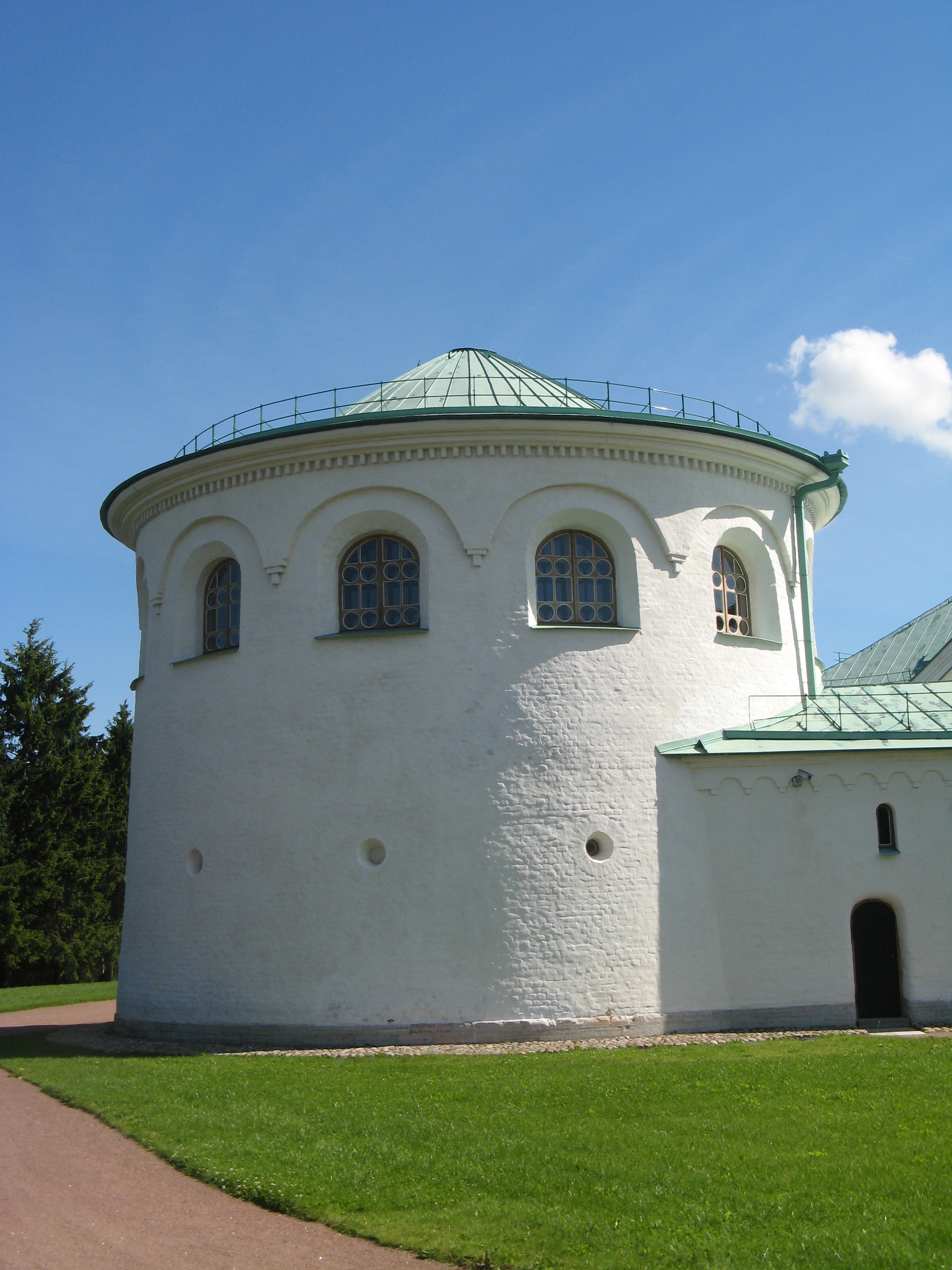
Round tower

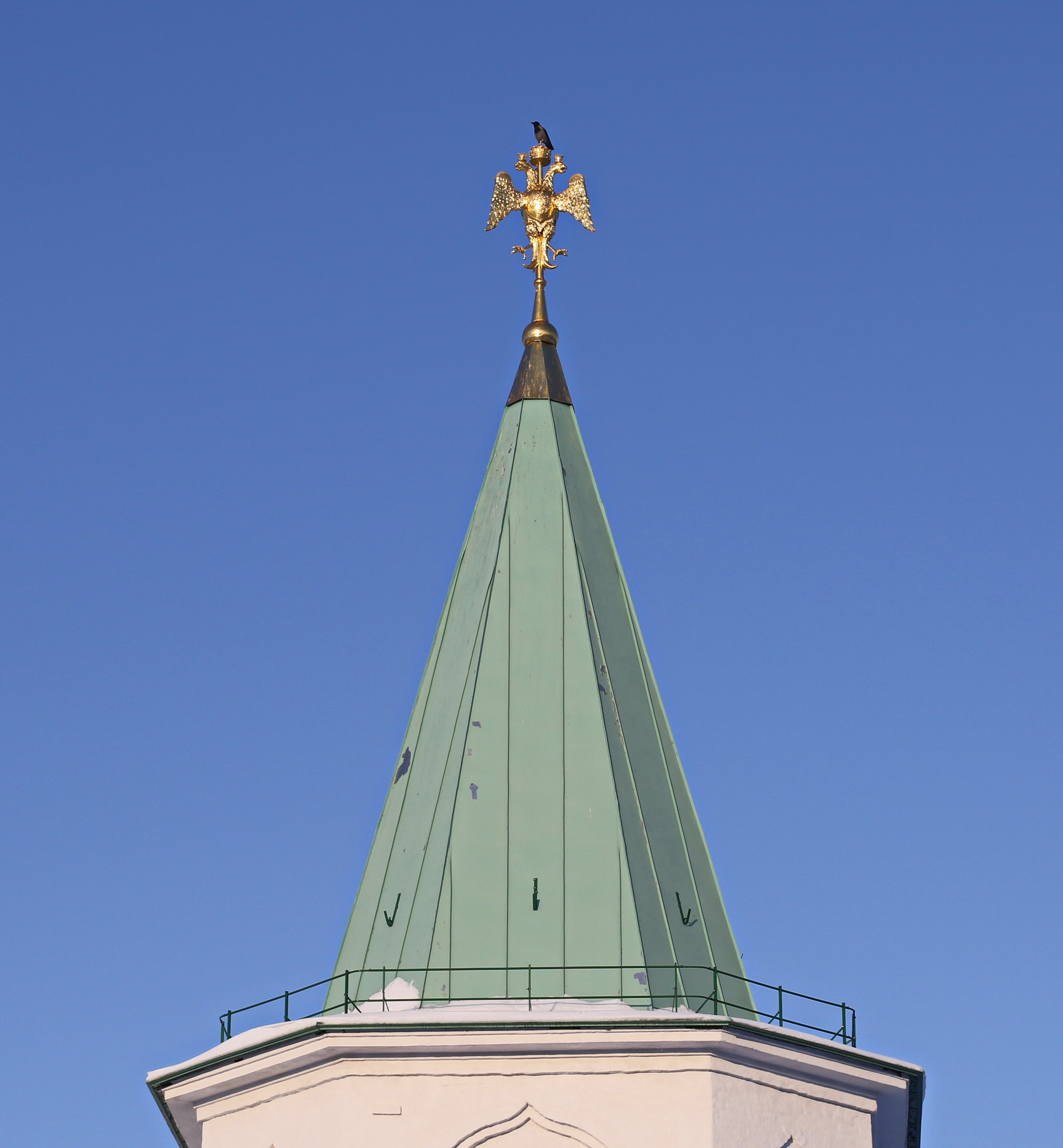
A tower topped with the royal double-headed eagle
